= Craniofacial regeneration =

Process by which the skull and face regrow to heal an injury

Craniofacial regeneration refers to the biological process by which the skull and face regrow to heal an injury. This page covers birth defects and injuries related to the craniofacial region, the mechanisms behind the regeneration, the medical application of these processes, and the scientific research conducted on this specific regeneration. This regeneration is not to be confused with tooth regeneration. Craniofacial regrowth is broadly related to the mechanisms of general bone healing.

== Function ==
Craniofacial regeneration is necessary following injury to the facial tissue. This can occur during surgery, where doctors fracture the face of a patient in order to correct craniofacial abnormalities such as cleft lip, Apert syndrome, Treacher Collins syndrome, Oligodontia, Cherubism, Crouzon syndrome, Pfeiffer Syndrome, Craniosynostosis, or Goldenhar Syndrome. Other applications include corrections to birth defects (such as hypertelorism), maxillofacial surgery, craniosynostosis, rare craniofacial clefts, or removal of tumors. This regeneration can also be necessary following trauma to the face, most often due to automotive accidents.

Craniofacial defects are most common congenitally (present at birth), with an estimated prevalence of 1 in 700 live births (270,000 children per year). Common corrective procedures include intracranial surgeries (making room for brain growth through skull expansion), Cleft palate surgeries (repairing a gap in the roof of the mouth), and Cleft lip surgeries (closing a gap in the lips).

Most patients who suffer from craniofacial abnormalities have a normal life expectancy, but symptoms are often present throughout the patient's life. Common symptoms and features of a craniofacial defect include abnormal cranial morphology, difficulty in cranio-related functions such as breathing, hearing, swallowing, or speech, or facial paralysis.

== Research and historical context ==
In the 1970s, mesenchymal stem cells (MSCs) were discovered by A.J. Friedenstein. Mesenchymal stem cell research has yielded the most promising results for craniofacial regeneration, as MSCs can be found in many types of postnatal tissues, including orofacial tissues. Alginate hydrogel, which contains nerve growth factor, has been used to deliver stem cells to tissues during regeneration.

=== Stem cells ===
While there is a lack of craniofacial-specific clinical trials regarding stem cell therapies, there has been great effort in identifying craniofacial-specific stem cell populations, precursor cells that can give rise to many specific structures of the skull. Such stem cells include bone marrow mesenchymal stem cells (BMMSC), adipose-derived mesenchymal stem cells (AMCs), muscle satellite cells (MuSCs), periodontal ligament stem cells (PDLSCs), and stem cells from human exfoliated deciduous (SHED teeth). The following section will outline the two most promising stem cell populations in craniofacial bone regeneration.

==== Bone marrow mesenchymal stem cells (BMMSC) ====
BMMSCs have been reported to repair craniofacial defects. In 1994, it was demonstrated that when BMMSCs were grown in culture with dexamethasone, ascorbic acid 2-phosphate, and inorganic phosphate, they differentiated into functional osteoblast-like cells. However, when challenged in vivo, it was reported that only "a little over half" of the mice with the differentiated BMMSCs showed potential to develop bone structure. Developments in BMMSCs application to bone repair have nonetheless been proven successful in many animal models including canines, mice, and sheep.

==== Adipose-derived mesenchymal stem cells (AMCs) ====
AMCs have also showed promise in craniofacial bone regeneration. In 2014, George K. Sándor performed a small size clinical trial (n = 13) on patients with craniomaxillofacial defects where AMCs were transplanted with scaffolds of either bioactive glass or β-tricalcium phosphate in an attempt to reconstruct the defect. β-tricalcium phosphate scaffolds are characterized by their porous three-dimensional synthetic scaffold structures that stimulate growth, migration, and differentiation in human cells leading to bone reparation. This study saw 10 out of the 13 patients successfully integrate the AMCs and scaffolds. In 2017, the National Institute of Dental and Craniofacial Research (NIDCR) awarded $24 million to two centers focused on craniofacial disease and injury research.

== Mechanism & Important Factors ==
Following facial tissue injury, craniofacial regeneration occurs in a sequence of steps. The process of regeneration is initiated by an inflammatory response to injury, followed by angiogenesis, leading to mesenchymal stem cell (MSC) differentiation. Additional related steps include the healing process and nerve regeneration, which is briefly covered.

=== Inflammation ===
During inflammation, there is a disturbance of connective tissue (collagen) for release necessary healing proteins. Inflammation is a normal indication of injury and activates macrophages, which recruit lymphocytes to the site of injury. These lymphocytes secrete cytokines. Cytokines are proteins that are assist in mediating the immune response to inflammation. The presence of cytokines stimulates angiogenesis and MSCs differentiation into osteoblasts, which eventually constitute new bone. Chronic inflammation, which mimics aging, has been shown to negatively affect bone regeneration. The exact reasoning behind the limit on inflammation needed for bone regeneration is not completely understood in the context of immune responses.

=== Angiogenesis and VEGF ===
Angiogenesis occurs after inflammation and it is the formation of blood vessels from previously existing ones. This process takes place in the form of fast outgrowth and organization of blood vessels. Angiogenesis occurs in organ regeneration, tissue healing, and neoplasia processes. It has been shown that angiogenesis is highly dependent upon extracellular and inflammatory signals such as cytokines, proteases, and growth factors. Integrins, a type of transmembrane receptor protein, have been shown to be important for angiogenesis. When they are inhibited, specifically integrin α5β1, angiogenesis does not occur. Targeting integrin αvβ5 was shown to have a negative effect on vascular endothelial growth factor (VEGF)-dependent angiogenesis. This was not shown directly in conjunction with craniofacial regeneration.

Angiogenesis allows for oxygen, nutrients, inflammatory cells, cartilage, and bone progenitor (precursors) to reach the site of regeneration. Animal models that enhanced angiogenesis also showed enhanced regenerative abilities. Angiogenesis is also temporally significant for bone regeneration. It has been shown that osteoblasts that originate from vascular endothelial growth factor (VEGF) signaling play a crucial role for the development of new bone during regeneration. VEGF is also a key regulator of angiogenesis.

VEGF has two known roles in bone regeneration: promotion of endothelial cell proliferation and migration, and the activation of osteogenesis. Despite this knowledge, the mechanism by which VEGF controls bone homeostasis is poorly understood.

In addition, VEGF is necessary for a specific bone regeneration pathway called intramembranous ossification, where mesenchymal tissue is directed towards bone formation. This involves the direct differentiation of bone progenitors to osteoblasts (contrary to a cartilage intermediate in endochondral ossification). Many primary literature papers have demonstrated that a loss-of-function experiment against VEGF in the osteoblast precursors significantly reduces ossification in craniofacial bone structures, highlighting the essential role of VEGF in craniofacial regeneration.

=== Mesenchymal Stem Cells (MSCs) ===
Osteogenic tissue is fibrous tissue that can become bone tissue (marrow, endosteum, nutrient artery, and periosteum). Bone regeneration takes place during fracture healing and bone remodeling that takes place throughout life. Bone healing also tends to occur without scar formation and with full functional capacities being restored. Growth factors, such as bone morphogenic proteins (BMPs), are important in inducing the differentiation of MSCs during bone regeneration. Bone regeneration in adults appears to mimic bone development during embryogenesis, except for the requirement of inflammation to initiate the regenerative process. Another difference between bone development and regeneration is the decreased number of osteoprogenitor cells during regeneration. During embryogenesis, MSCs aggregate and condense, creating cartilage. Some of these cells differentiate, creating membranous ossification (bone tissue formation) while some committed osteoprogenitor cells from the periosteum (type of osteogenic tissue) and undifferentiated multipotent MSC from the bone marrow lead to callus formation, which aids in fracture healing.

Undifferentiated MSCs are limited in adults, but these cells along with committed osteoprogenitor cells are both involved in callus formation. Along with MSCs and osteoprogenitors, mechanobiology also influences bone regeneration. Simply put, compression can enhance bone apposition. This is known as Wolff's law, which essentially states that bone remodeling occurs to counter and adapt to loads placed upon it.

Mature osteoblasts are differentiated precursor cells found in the bone marrow. MSCs are typically found in the bone marrow stroma. MSC differentiation is induced by a cocktail of morphogens and other factors. Human MSCs have been shown to differentiate with a cocktail of dexamethasone, isobutyl methyl xanthine, insulin and rosiglitazone (a peroxisome proliferator-activated receptor γ2 (PPAR-γ2) agonist) in vitro.

Scientific understanding of bone regeneration in vitro is limited. Thus, in vivo assays have been explored. One such assay is the "gold standard" assay, created by A.J. Friedenstein. His test utilizes diffusion chambers (open system) in which he implanted MSCs into immunodeficient mice. When this was done, he observed that MSCs formed bone and bone marrow. His test has also been used to demonstrate self-renewal and maintenance of "stemness" in serial implantations.

=== Healing Process ===
One week following injury there are two ossification fronts lying at the end of each bony fragment. In between these two fragments is an intermediate zone consisting largely of fibroblasts and poorly differentiated osteoblasts. Fibroblasts proliferate in this area, arising from marrow cells with fibroblastic potential. From the 1st to the 3rd week following injury, regenerated bone begins to fill in the gap between the two bony fragments. The first osteons begin to appear within the depths of the growth zone and there are numerous hypertrophied vessels. The medullary canal appears by means of osteoclastic resorption.

=== Nerve Regeneration ===
Following facial injury it is also critical to restore nerve function to avoid facial paralysis. Often, patients who received surgery following injury or tumor resection suffer extensive nerve damage. This is a serious problem given the importance of facial expressions and speech for communicating in human society. For many who endure such nerve damage, they recover after 12 months; however, others may never fully recover. While there is not currently much modern medicine can do for these patients, the cutting edge of care is now nerve grafting. These grafts are taken from the masseter muscle, which controls mouth movement, or the hypoglossal nerve which controls the tongue. To avoid denervation caused by lack of stimulus, surgery should be done as soon as possible; however, it is often difficult to determine if a patient will recover naturally or whether nerve grafting is required. Generally this distinction can be made by 6 months post injury and grafting occurs soon after. Nerve grafting works through lessening the degenerative effects of denervation and by accelerating the regeneration of motor neurons. This works through providing nerve signaling distal to the site of injury, helping the regenerating nerve to find the correct path. More than half of patients (57%) of patients who receive nerve grafts showed signs of nerve function within 6 months of receiving a graft.

== Experimental models ==
Current approaches to craniofacial research are spearheaded by a branch of the U.S. National Institutes of Health, named the National Institute of Dental and Craniofacial Research (NIDCR). With regards to regenerative medicine, the NIDCR invested $52 million in "basic, translational, and clinical" regenerative research in 2017. These experiments include but are not limited to:

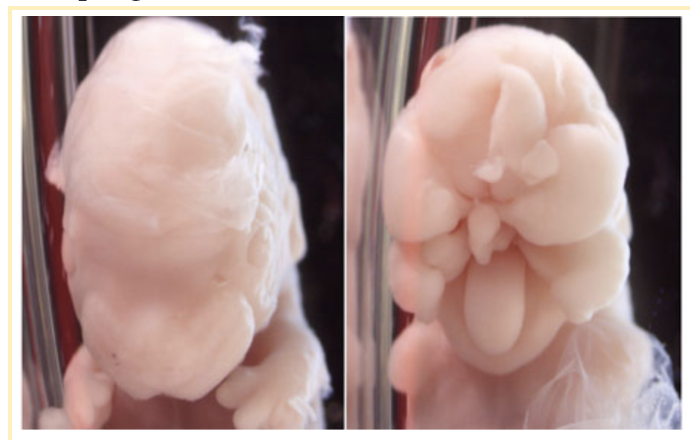
The left plane depicts a wildtype (normal) mouse embryo, and the right plane is a genetically edited mouse that lacks the gene Sp8. Normal development proceeded in the wildtype, but the Sp8 mutant lacked facial structure yet presented a tongue and a mandible.

- Microengineering blood vessels: enhancing current engineering of nutrient-rich blood vessels to promote transplanted tissues and bone precursor cells (cells that will give rise to bone structure). Proper engineering of these circulating blood vessels would alleviate pressure on newly implanted cells or craniofacial structures.
- Designing stronger cartilage: challenging cartilage cells in vitro (in the laboratory) with harsh conditions to mimic the environment of a craniofacial defect. It is vital that laboratory-generated cartilage be comparable in strength to natural cartilage.
- Isolating bone stem cells: purifying stem cells from a collection of human fat tissue that can generate bone in vivo (animal models).

Researchers are also implementing many genetic tools to further understand craniofacial regeneration. Developmental biologists have been reported to use laser capture microdissection and fluorescence-activated cell sorter (FACS) to create an array of genes involved in craniofacial development.

Identification of specific genes necessary in craniofacial development can lead to striking transgenic experiments. These types of procedures involve genetically editing organisms to understand the function of their genes. For example, using Cre-recombinase, an enzyme which makes specific cuts in the genome, researchers were able to knockout the expression of Sp8, a gene hypothesized to be essential for face development. In the resulting mouse model, it was observed that facial development was significantly impaired, yet a tongue and a mandible were present (see image). Transgenic animal models is just one way in which researchers are attempting to understand craniofacial abnormalities.

== Causes of craniofacial injury ==
=== Physical injury ===
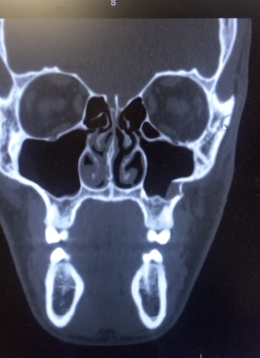
X-ray of a human face following a fracture to the zygomatic arch

These injuries happen predominantly in young males, often as a result of traffic accidents which result in 22% of all craniofacial trauma. Craniofacial injuries can result in death due to brain damage and airway blockage. Following serious injury resulting in airway blockage, the standard of care is to intubate, which involves inserting a flexible tube into the trachea to maintain airflow, followed by immediate surgical intervention (41% of injuries). Mechanical ventilation (65% of injuries), blood transfusion (28% of injuries) and tracheostomy (22% of injuries) are also common following trauma. Head injuries often coincide with craniofacial trauma, extradural hematoma (bleeding in between the skull and the dura mater), and subdural hematomas (bleeding between the dura mater and the brain). Injury to the skull included fractures of frontal bone (20.15% of injuries), sphenoid bone (11.63% of injuries), orbital roof (13.18% of injuries), and fracture of cribriform and ethmoid bone complex (13.18%) with associated cerebrospinal fluid rhinorrhea.

The usual surgery used to treat severe craniofacial injury occurs in three stages. Craniotomy is performed immediately, followed by orbitofacial repair 7–10 days later and finally cranioplasty after 6–12 months.

=== Genetic disorders ===
Treacher Collins syndrome, cherubism and Stickler syndrome are all examples of rare genetic conditions that cause facial deformities. These diseases manifest symptoms in the head, face, mouth, or neck region, and they influence both appearance and function. These disabilities can lead to sleep apnea, poor oral health, and speech impediments.

==== Treacher Collins syndrome ====
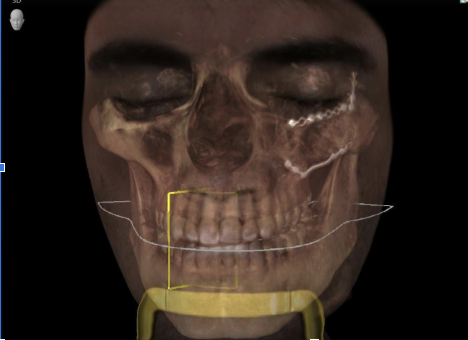
Same patient as above. Follow up image 6 months post reconstructive surgery. Titanium screws and plates were inserted to help hold bones in place.

Treacher Collins syndrome is a rare autosomal dominant condition. Symptoms usually include downward-slanting palpebral fissures and hypoplasia of the zygomatic arches. Patients can also suffer from hypoplasia of the mandible, cleft palate, lower eyelid coloboma, microtia, atresia of the ear canal, and hearing loss. Treatments can include reconstructive surgeries of the eye, ear and zygomatic arch, orthodontics and hearing aids.

==== Cherubism ====
Cherubism is a rare autosomal dominant condition caused by mutations in the SH3BP2 gene. Patients afflicted have symmetrical enlargement of the jaws, caused by the replacement of bone with fibrous tissue. In the most severe cases, the orbital floor is affected, which results in upward-looking eyes. In some cases, patients are afflicted with missing and displaced teeth. Treatments include tooth removal and transplantation and removal of intra-bony soft tissue.

==== Stickler syndrome ====
Stickler syndrome is a rare autosomal dominant connective tissue disorder estimated to affect approximately 1/7500 newborns. Symptoms include retrognathia, maxillary hypoplasia, cleft palate, hearing impairment, musculoskeletal anomalies and cardiac defects. Treatment generally includes supportive care for musculoskeletal deformities, recognition and treatment of early hearing loss, and reconstructive surgery.

=== Surgery ===
Facial surgery is often voluntary to make features more aesthetically pleasing. Rhinoplasty is exceedingly common, with 220,000 procedures occurring each year. They are used for improving the outward appearance of the nose and for improving nasal airway flow. The first step is an incision into the columella, the skin connecting the nostrils. Surgeons can then remove cartilage and bone to correct a dorsal hump, wide tip, or crooked nose. They are also able to correct deviated septums, which are a common airway blockage. Once this is completed, the incisions are closed and splits are placed to maintain stability during the healing process. Aesthetic surgery is also common following tumor resections, where plastic surgeons correct soft tissue or bone misalignments that occurred due to the removal of a tumor. These procedures can involve bone grafts from the pelvis or ribs to replace removed bone and implantation of titanium plates and screws to hold pieces of bone together.
