= Ossification =

Development process in bones

Bone is broken down by osteoclasts, and rebuilt by osteoblasts, both of which communicate through cytokine (TGF-β, IGF) signalling.

Ossification (also called osteogenesis or bone mineralization) in bone remodeling is the process of laying down new bone material by cells named osteoblasts. It is synonymous with bone tissue formation. There are two processes resulting in the formation of normal, healthy bone tissue: Intramembranous ossification is the direct laying down of bone into the primitive connective tissue (mesenchyme), while endochondral ossification, also known as intracartilaginous ossification, involves cartilage as a precursor. A third, largely overooked, form of ossification is ectochondral ossification, a process wherein bone originating endochondrally can invade and ossify surrounding membranes beyond the shape of the original cartilage.

In fracture healing, endochondral osteogenesis is the most commonly occurring process, for example in fractures of long bones treated by plaster of Paris, whereas fractures treated by open reduction and internal fixation with metal plates, screws, pins, rods and nails may heal by intramembranous osteogenesis.

Heterotopic ossification is a process resulting in the formation of bone tissue that is often atypical, at an extraskeletal location. Calcification is often confused with ossification. Calcification is synonymous with the formation of calcium-based salts and crystals within cells and tissue. It is a process that occurs during ossification, but not necessarily vice versa.

The exact mechanisms by which bone development is triggered remains unclear, but growth factors and cytokines appear to play a role.

Time period	Bones affected
Third month of fetal development	Ossification in long bones beginning
Fourth month	Most primary ossification centers have appeared in the diaphyses of bone.
Birth to five years	Secondary ossification centers appear in the epiphyses
five years to 12 years in females, 5 to 14 years in males	Ossification is spreading rapidly from the ossification centers and various bones are becoming ossified.
17 to 20 years	Bone of upper limbs and scapulae becoming completely ossified
18 to 23 years	Bone of the lower limbs and os coxae become completely ossified
23 to 26 years	Bone of the sternum, clavicles, and vertebrae become completely ossified
By 25 years	Nearly all bones are completely ossified

== Intramembranous ossification ==
Intramembranous ossification is one of two key processes during fetal skeletal development and is an essential process during the natural healing of bone fractures. It forms the flat bones of the skull, mandible, and hip bone among others.

Woven bone is formed when mesenchymal stem cells (MSCs), an unspecified cell that can develop into an osteoblast, initiate intramembranous ossification. First, a small group of adjacent MSCs differentiate into osteoblast and begin to replicate and form a small, dense cell clusters. This forms an ossification centre, at which point the osteoblasts begin secreting osteoid, an unmineralized collagen-proteoglycan matrix that can bind calcium. Binding calcium to the osteoid hardens the matrix and entraps the osteoblasts. This entrapment transforms the osteoblasts into osteocytes.

As osteoblasts continue to secrete osteoid, it surrounds blood vessels and forms trabecular, cancellous, or spongy bone. Over time, these blood vessels develop into red bone marrow. MSCs on the bone's surface form the periosteum, a membrane covering the outer surface of bones. MSCs on the inner surface of the periosteum develop into osteoblasts and secrete osteoid parallel with the existing matrix, which creates layers. The result of this is compact or cortical bone.

== Endochondral ossification ==
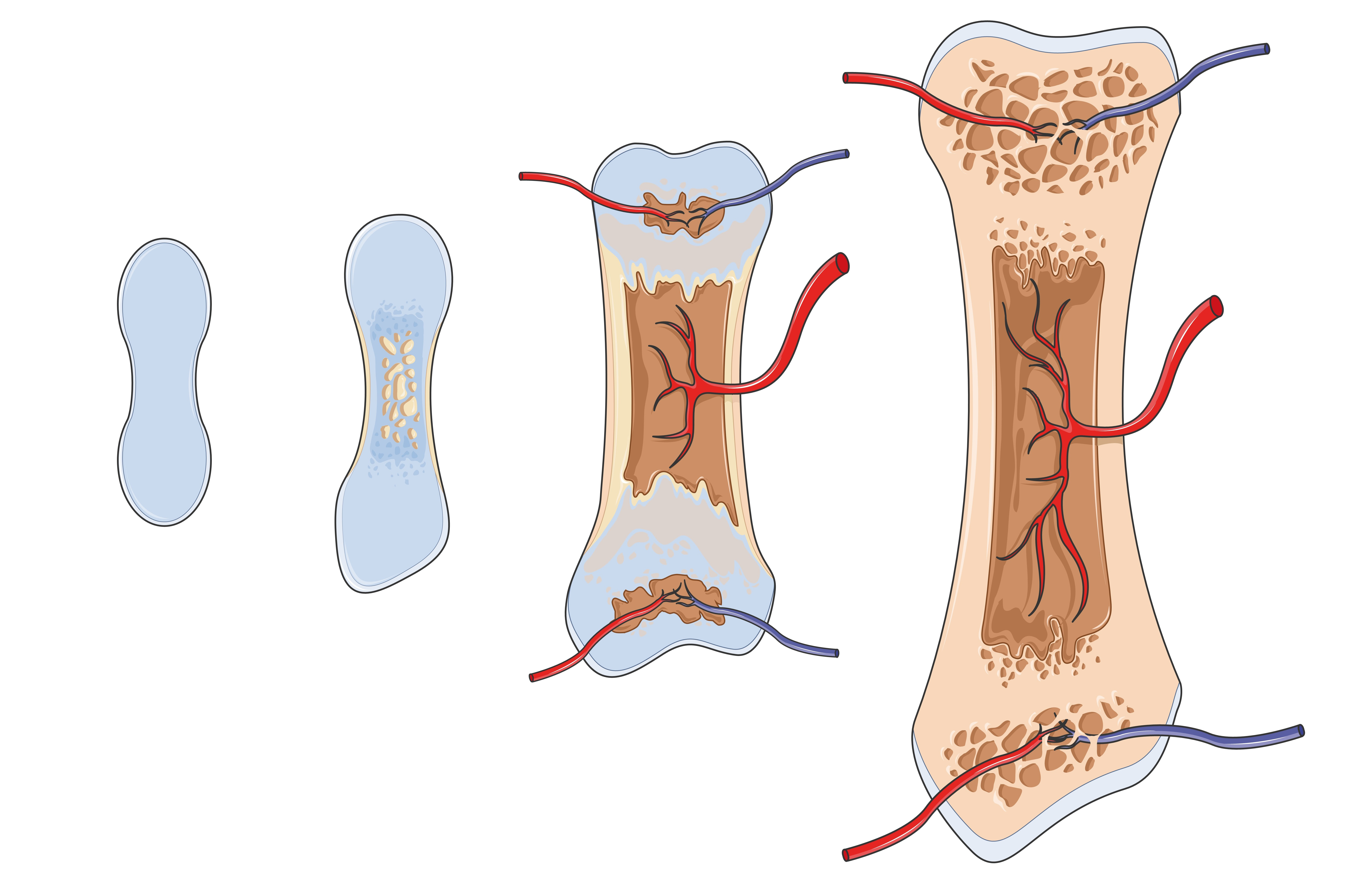
Diagram showing stages of endochondral ossification, from cartilage (left), to the fully formed bone (right).

Endochondral ossification, or intracartilaginous ossification, is the formation of long bones and other bones. This requires a hyaline cartilage precursor. There are two centers of ossification for endochondral ossification.

The primary center

In long bones, bone tissue first appears in the diaphysis (middle of shaft). Chondrocytes multiply and form trabeculae. Cartilage is progressively eroded and replaced by hardened bone, extending towards the epiphysis. A perichondrium layer surrounding the cartilage forms the periosteum, which generates osteogenic cells that then go on to make a collar that encircles the outside of the bone and remodels the medullary cavity on the inside.

The nutrient artery enters via the nutrient foramen from a small opening in the diaphysis. It invades the primary center of ossification, bringing osteogenic cells (osteoblasts on the outside, osteoclasts on the inside.) The canal of the nutrient foramen is directed away from more active end of bone when one end grows more than the other. When bone grows at same rate at both ends, the nutrient artery is perpendicular to the bone.

Most other bones (e.g. vertebrae) also have primary ossification centers, and bone is laid down in a similar manner.

Secondary centers

The secondary centers generally appear at the epiphysis. Secondary ossification mostly occurs after birth (except for distal femur and proximal tibia which occurs during 9th month of fetal development). The epiphyseal arteries and osteogenic cells invade the epiphysis, depositing osteoclasts and osteoblasts which erode the cartilage and build bone, respectively. This occurs at both ends of long bones but only one end of digits and ribs.

== Ectochondral ossification ==
Ectochondral ossification, or Zuwachsknochen, occurs less commonly than the other two forms of ossification. It occurs when ossification that initiates endochondrally invades membranes attaching to the perichondrium; by growth along the membrane, the bone attains a morphology not seen in the cartilage. It differs from endochondral bone due to its extension beyond the original cartilage; it differs from intramembranous bone due to initiating endochondrally. Historically overlooked, ectochondral ossification has seen a resurgence of attention in the late 2020s.

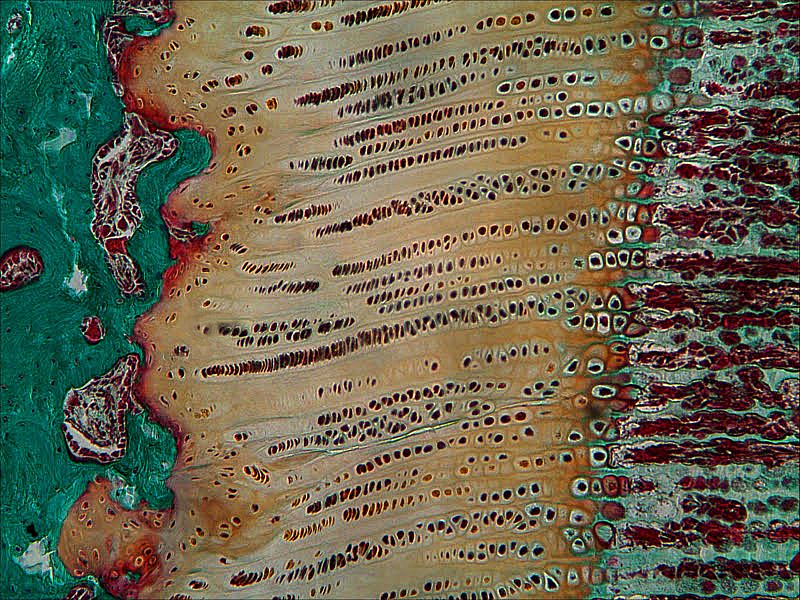
Microscopic image of the growth plate

== Evolution ==
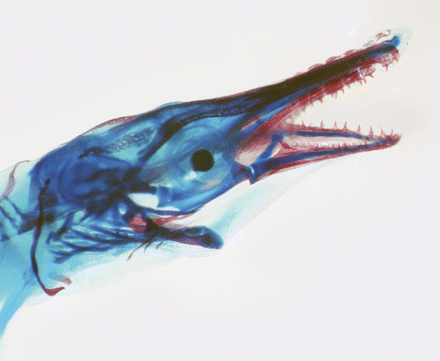
A spotted gar larva at 22 days stained for cartilage (blue) and bone (red).

Several hypotheses have been proposed for how bone evolved as a structural element in vertebrates. One hypothesis is that bone developed from tissues that evolved to store minerals. Specifically, calcium-based minerals were stored in cartilage and bone was an exaptation development from this calcified cartilage. However, other possibilities include bony tissue evolving as an osmotic barrier, or as a protective structure.

== See also ==
- Dystrophic calcification
- Mechanostat, a model describing ossification and bone loss
- Ossicone, the horn-like (or antler-like) protuberances on the heads of giraffes and related species
- Osteogenesis imperfecta, a juvenile bone disease
- Fibrodysplasia ossificans progressiva, an extremely rare genetic disease which causes fibrous tissue (muscle, tendon, ligament etc.) to ossify when damaged
- Primrose syndrome, a rare genetic disease in which cartilage becomes ossified.
