= Nonunion =

Failure of a bone to heal after breakage

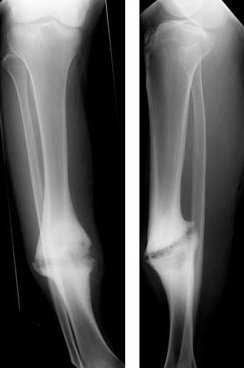
- Hypertrophic nonunion of the tibia
- Specialty: Orthopedics

Nonunion is permanent failure of healing following a broken bone unless intervention (such as surgery) is performed. A fracture with nonunion generally forms a structural resemblance to a fibrous joint, and is therefore often called a "false joint" or pseudoarthrosis (from Greek pseudo-, meaning false, arthron, meaning joint, and -osis, meaning abnormal condition). The diagnosis is generally made when there is no healing between two sets of medical imaging, such as X-ray or CT scan. This is generally after 6–8 months.

Nonunion is a serious complication of a fracture and may occur when the fracture moves too much, has a poor blood supply or gets infected. Patients who smoke have a higher incidence of nonunion. The normal process of bone healing is interrupted or stalled.

Since the process of bone healing is quite variable, a nonunion may go on to heal without intervention in very few cases. In general, if a nonunion is still evident at 6 months post-injury it will remain unhealed without specific treatment, usually orthopedic surgery. A non-union which does go on to heal is called a delayed union.

== Signs and symptoms ==
A history of a broken bone is usually apparent. The patient complains of persistent pain at the fracture site and may also notice abnormal movement or clicking at the level of the fracture. An X-ray plate of the fractured bone shows a persistent radiolucent line at the fracture. Callus formation may be evident but callus does not bridge across the fracture. If there is doubt about the interpretation of the x-ray, stress x-rays, tomograms or CT scan may be used for confirmation.

== Causes ==
The reasons for non-union are:

- avascular necrosis (the blood supply was interrupted by the fracture)
- the two ends are not apposed (that is, they are not next to each other)
- infection (particularly osteomyelitis)
- the fracture is not fixed (that is, the two ends are still mobile)
- soft-tissue imposition (there is muscle or ligament covering the broken ends and preventing them from touching each other)

== Risk factors ==
1. Related to the person:
  1. Old age.
  2. Poor nutritional status.
  3. Habitual nicotine and alcohol consumption.
  4. Metabolic disturbances such as hyperparathyroidism.
  5. Can be found in those with NF1.
  6. Genetic predisposition.
2. Related to the fracture site:
  1. Soft tissue interposition.
  2. Bone loss at the fracture.
  3. Infection.
  4. Loss of blood supply.
  5. Damage of surrounding muscles.
3. Related to the treatment:
  1. Inadequate reduction.
  2. Insufficient immobilization.
  3. Improperly applied fixation devices.

== Types of nonunion ==
There are typically three types of nonunion described.

=== Hypertrophic nonunion ===
In a hypertrophic nonunion, the fracture site contains adequate blood supply but the fracture ends fail to heal together. X-rays show abundant callus formation. This type of nonunion is thought to occur when the body has adequate biology, such as stem cells and blood supply, but inadequate stability, meaning the bone ends are moving too much. Typically, the treatment consists of increasing stability of the fracture site with surgical implants.

=== Atrophic nonunion ===
In an atrophic nonunion, x-rays show little to no callus formation. This is usually due to impaired bony healing, for example due to vascular causes (e.g. impaired blood supply to the bone fragments) or metabolic causes (e.g. diabetes or smoking). Failure of initial union, as when bone fragments are separated by soft tissue, may also lead to an atrophic non-union. Atrophic non-unions can be treated by stimulating blood flow and encouraging healing. This is often done surgically by removing the end layer of bone to provide raw ends for healing and the use of bone grafts.

=== Oligotrophic nonunion ===
As the name implies, an oligotrophic nonunion demonstrates some attempt by the body to heal the fracture. These are thought to arise from adequate biology but displacement at the fracture site.

== Diagnosis ==
A diagnosis of nonunion is made when the clinician feels there will be no further bone healing without intervention. The FDA defines it as a fracture at least 9 months old that has not shown any signs of radiographic healing within the last 3 months. CT scans offer a closer look at the fracture and may also be used to evaluate how much of the fracture has healed. Blood tests can evaluate if the patient has adequate levels of nutrients such as calcium and vitamin D. Blood tests can also look for markers of infection such as ESR and CRP.

== Treatment ==
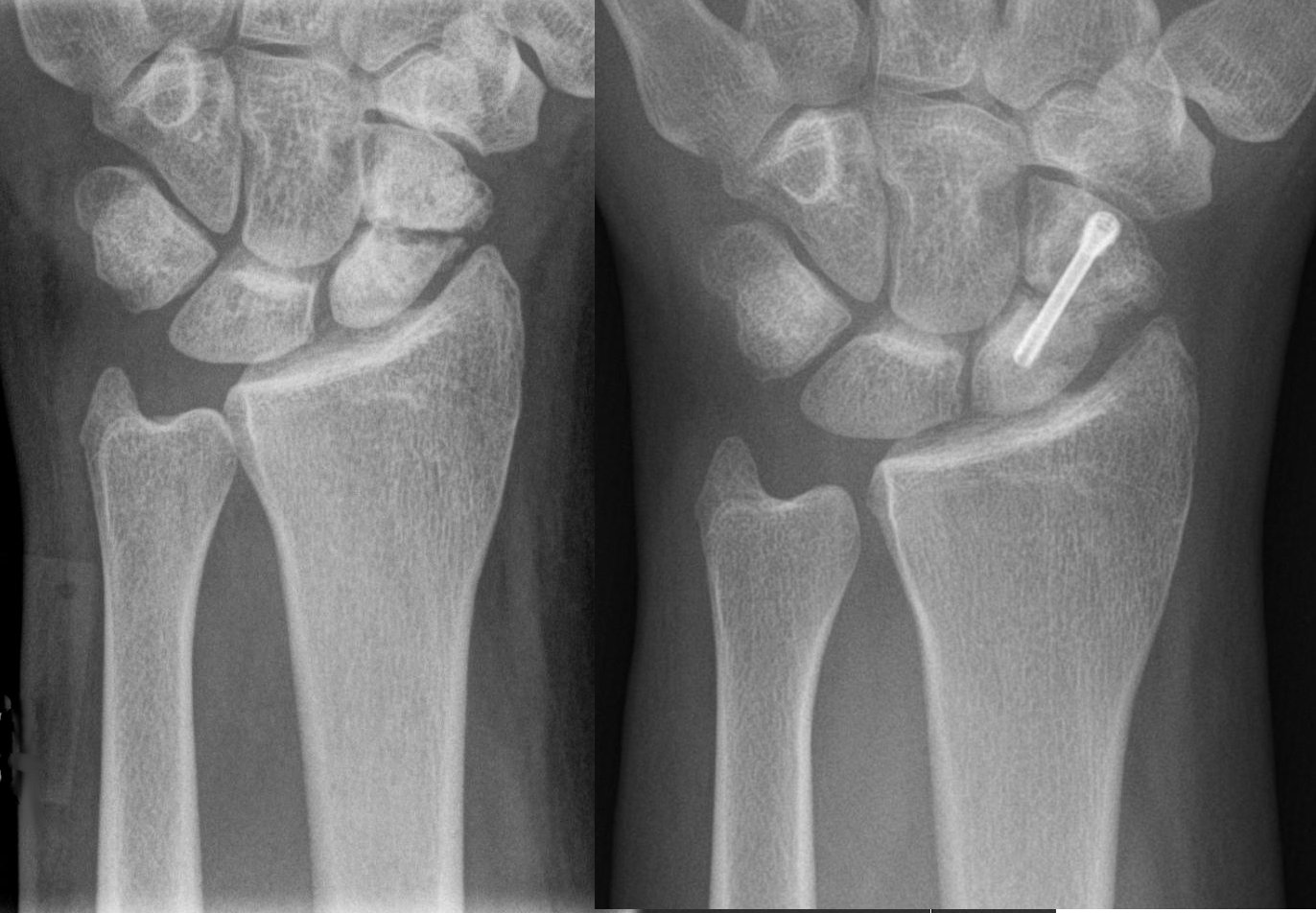
Scaphoid pseudarthrosis before and after surgical fixation

=== Surgery ===
Currently, there are different strategies to augment the bone-regeneration process, however, there is no standardised clinical treatment guideline yet. Surgical treatment options include:

- Debridement: radical surgical removal of necrotic or infected soft tissue and bone tissue is deemed essential for the healing process.
- Immobilization of the fracture with internal or external fixation. Metal plates, pins, screws, and rods, that are screwed or driven into a bone, are used to stabilize the broken bone fragments.
- Bone grafting. Filling of the bone defect resulting from debridement must be performed. Autologous bone graft is the "gold standard" treatment and possesses osteogenic, osteoinductive, and osteoconductive properties, although only a limited sample can be taken and there is a high risk of side effects.
- Bone graft substitutes. Inorganic bone substitutes may be used to complement or replace autologous bone grafting. The advantage is that there is no morbidity on sampling and their availability is not restricted. S53P4 bioactive glass has shown good results as a promising bone graft substitute in treatment of nonunions, due to its osteostimulative, osteoconductive and antimicrobial properties.

In simple cases, healing may be evident within 3 months. Gavriil Ilizarov revolutionized the treatment of recalcitrant nonunions demonstrating that the affected area of the bone could be removed, the fresh ends "docked" and the remaining bone lengthened using an external fixator device. The time course of healing after such treatment is longer than normal bone healing. Usually, there are signs of union within 3 months, but the treatment may continue for many months beyond that.

=== Bone stimulation ===
Bone stimulation with either electromagnetic or ultrasound waves has been suggested to reduce the healing time for non-union fractures. The proposed mechanism of action is by stimulating osteoblasts and other proteins that form bones using these modalities. The evidence supporting the use of ultrasound and shockwave therapy for improving unions is very weak and it is likely that these approaches do not make a clinically significant difference for a delayed union or non-union.

== Prognosis ==
By definition, a nonunion will not heal if left alone. Therefore, the patient's symptoms will not be improved and the function of the limb will remain impaired. It will be painful to bear weight on it and it may be deformed or unstable. The prognosis of nonunion if treated depends on many factors including the age and general health of the patient, the time since the original injury, the number of previous surgeries, smoking history, the patient's ability to cooperate with the treatment. In the region of 80% of nonunions heal after the first operation. The success rate with subsequent surgeries is less.

== See also ==
- Distraction osteogenesis
