= Bone collar =

Structure in bone development

The bone collar is a cuff of periosteal bone that forms around the diaphysis of the hyaline cartilage model in developing long bones. The bone collar appears during endochondral bone development to support the growing bone and help it retain its shape.
