= Reid index =

The Reid Index is a mathematical relationship that exists in a human bronchus section observed under the microscope. It is defined as ratio between the thickness of the submucosal mucus secreting glands and the thickness between the epithelium and cartilage that covers the bronchi. The Reid index is not of diagnostic use in vivo since it requires a dissection of the airway tube, but it has value in post mortem evaluations and for research.

The Reid Index was developed in the late 1950s from the work of Dr. Lynne McArthur Reid, M.D. who first described the relationship between hypertrophic bronchial mucous glands and the resultant narrowing of the airways seen in chronic bronchitis. In 1967, Dr. Reid became the first woman to achieve the rank of professor of experimental pathology in England and later became the first dean of the Cardiothoracic Institute at London University.

== Calculation ==
$$\ RI = \frac {gland}{wall}$$

where:

RI is the Reid Index
wall is the thickness of the airway wall between the epithelium and the cartilage's perichondrium
gland is the thickness of the mucus-producing gland at the location of inspection.

== Interpretation ==
A normal Reid Index should be smaller than 0.4, the thickness of the wall is always more than double the thickness of the glands it contains. Chronic smoking causes submucosal gland hypertrophy and hyperplasia, leading to a Reid Index of >0.5 indicating chronic bronchitis.
