= Intramembranous ossification =

Mesenchymal bone development that forms the non-long bones

Intramembranous ossification is one of the essential processes during fetal development of the gnathostome (excluding chondrichthyans such as sharks) skeletal system by which rudimentary bone tissue is created. Intramembranous ossification is also an essential process during the natural healing of bone fractures and the rudimentary formation of bones of the head.

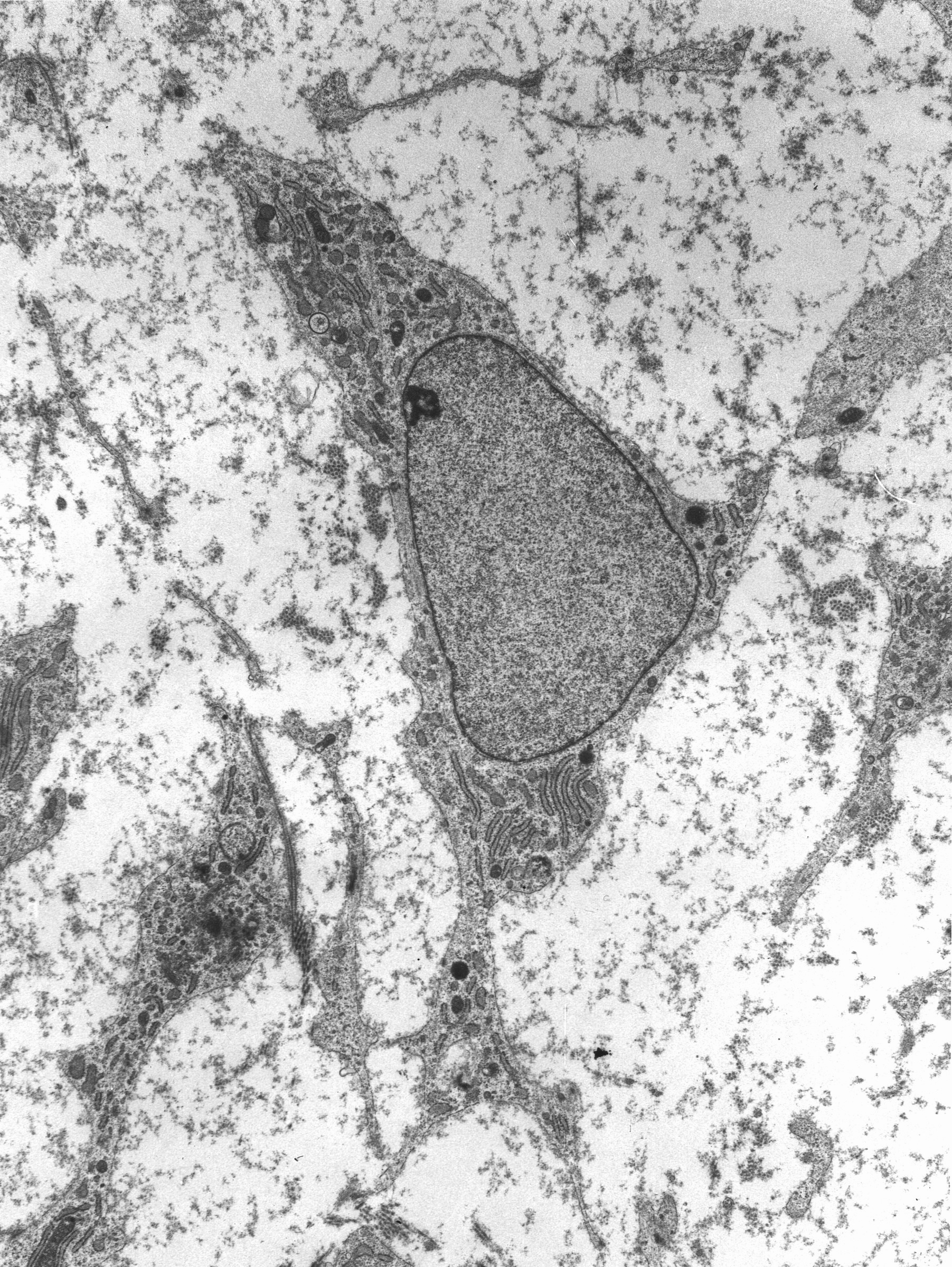
Transmission electron micrograph of a mesenchymal stem cell that is displaying typical ultrastructural characteristics.

Unlike endochondral ossification and ectochondral ossification, which are the other processes by which bone tissue is created during fetal development, cartilage is not present during intramembranous ossification.

== Formation of woven bone ==
Mesenchymal stem cells within mesenchyme or the medullary cavity of a bone fracture initiate the process of intramembranous ossification. A mesenchymal stem cell, or MSC, is an unspecialized cell that can develop into an osteoblast. Before it begins to develop, the morphological characteristics of a MSC are: A small cell body with a few cell processes that are long and thin; a large, round nucleus with a prominent nucleolus that is surrounded by finely dispersed chromatin particles, giving the nucleus a clear appearance; and a small amount of Golgi apparatus, rough endoplasmic reticulum, mitochondria, and polyribosomes. Furthermore, the mesenchymal stem cells are widely dispersed within an extracellular matrix that is devoid of every type of collagen, except for a few reticular fibrils.

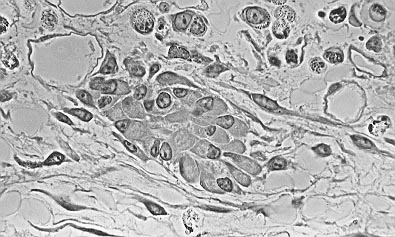
Light micrograph of a nidus consisting of osteoprogenitor cells that are displaying a prominent Golgi apparatus.

The process of intramembranous ossification starts when a small group of adjacent MSCs begin to replicate and form a small, dense cluster of cells that is called a nidus. (Note: Nidus is Latin for "nest". In tissue, a nidus resembles a nest morphologically, with respect to its appearance, and functionally, because it is a site where cell development occurs.) Once a nidus has been formed the MSCs within it stop replicating. At this point, morphological changes in the MSCs begin to occur: The cell body is now larger and rounder; the long, thin cell processes are no longer present; and the amount of Golgi apparatus and rough endoplasmic reticulum increases. Eventually, all of the cells within the nidus develop into, and display the morphologic characteristics of, an osteoprogenitor cell.

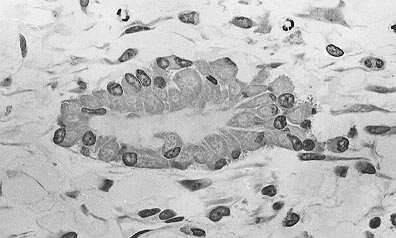
Light micrograph of a nidus consisting of osteoblasts, many are displaying a prominent Golgi apparatus, that have created osteoid at its center.

At this stage of development, changes in the morphology of the osteoprogenitor cells occur: Their shape becomes more columnar and the amount of Golgi apparatus and rough endoplasmic reticulum increases. Eventually, all of the cells within the nidus develop into, and display the morphologic characteristics of, an osteoblast. Then the osteoblasts create an extracellular matrix containing Type-I collagen fibrils, which is osteoid. The osteoblasts, while lining the periphery of the nidus, continue to form osteoid in the center of the nidus. Some of the osteoblasts become incorporated within the osteoid to become osteocytes.

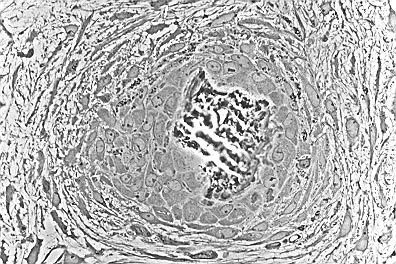
Light micrograph of an undecalcified nidus consisting of rudimentary bone tissue that is lined by numerous osteoblasts.

At this point, the osteoid becomes mineralized resulting in a nidus consisting of mineralized osteoid that contains osteocytes and is lined by active osteoblasts. The nidus, that began as a diffuse collection of MSCs, has developed into woven bone, the most rudimentary bone tissue.

== Formation of lamellar bone ==
The first step in the process is the formation of bone spicules which eventually fuse with each other and become trabeculae. The periosteum is formed and bone growth continues at the surface of trabeculae. Much like spicules, the increasing growth of trabeculae result in interconnection and this network is called woven bone. Eventually, woven bone is replaced by lamellar bone.

=== Formation of bone spicules ===
Embryologic mesenchymal cells (MSC) condense into layers of vascularized primitive connective tissue. Certain mesenchymal cells group together, usually near or around blood vessels, and differentiate into osteogenic cells which deposit bone matrix constitutively. These aggregates of bony matrix are called bone spicules. Separate mesenchymal cells differentiate into osteoblasts, which line up along the surface of the spicule and secrete more osteoid, which increases the size of the spicule.

=== Formation of trabecular bone ===
As the spicules continue to grow, they fuse with adjacent spicules and this results in the formation of trabeculae. When osteoblasts become trapped in the matrix they secrete, they differentiate into osteocytes. Osteoblasts continue to line up on the surface which increases the size. As growth continues, trabeculae become interconnected and trabecular bone is formed. The term primary spongiosa is also used to refer to the initial trabecular network.

=== Primary centre of ossification ===
The periosteum is formed around the trabeculae by differentiating mesenchymal cells. The primary center of ossification is the area where bone growth occurs between the periosteum and the bone. Osteogenic cells that originate from the periosteum increase appositional growth and a bone collar is formed. The bone collar is eventually mineralized and lamellar bone is formed.

=== Formation of osteons ===
Osteons are components or principal structures of compact bone. During the formation of bone spicules, cytoplasmic processes from osteoblasts interconnect. This becomes the canaliculi of osteons. Since bone spicules tend to form around blood vessels, the perivascular space is greatly reduced as the bone continues to grow. When replacement to compact bone occurs, this blood vessel becomes the central canal of the osteon.

== Examples in the human body ==
The following bones develop in humans via Intramembranous ossification:

- Most of the external bones of the skull (dermatocranium)
- Clavicles

Other bone that formed by intramembranous ossification are: cortices of tubular and flat bones as well as the calvaria, upper facial bones, tympanic temporal bone, vomer, and medial pterygoid process.

== See also ==
- Ossification
