= Bone healing =

Healing from bone injury

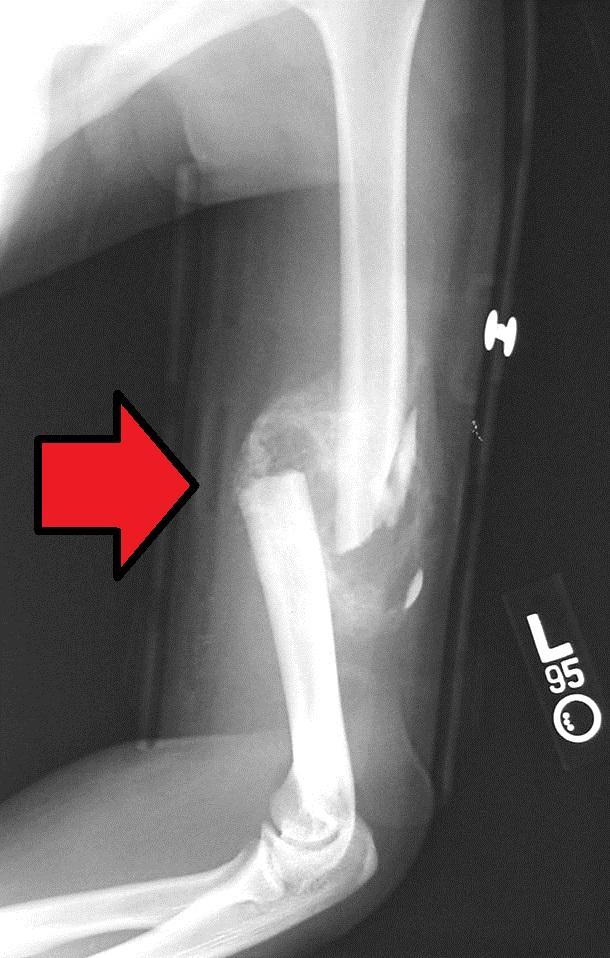
Bone healing of a fracture by forming a callus as shown by X-ray.

Bone healing, or fracture healing, is a proliferative physiological process in which the body facilitates the repair of a bone fracture.

Generally, bone fracture treatment consists of a doctor reducing (pushing) displaced bones back into place via relocation with or without anaesthetic, stabilizing their position to aid union, and then waiting for the bone's natural healing process to occur.

Adequate nutrient intake has been found to significantly affect the integrity of the fracture repair. Age, bone type, drug therapy and pre-existing bone pathology are factors that affect healing. The role of bone healing is to produce new bone without a scar as seen in other tissues which would be a structural weakness or deformity.

The process of the entire regeneration of the bone can depend on the angle of dislocation or fracture. While the bone formation usually spans the entire duration of the healing process, in some instances, bone marrow within the fracture has healed two or fewer weeks before the final remodelling phase.

While immobilization and surgery may facilitate healing, a fracture ultimately heals through physiological processes. The healing process is mainly determined by the periosteum (the connective tissue membrane covering the bone). The periosteum is one source of precursor cells that develop into chondroblasts and osteoblasts that are essential to the healing of bone. Other sources of precursor cells are the bone marrow (when present), endosteum, small blood vessels, and fibroblasts.

== Primary healing ==
Primary healing (also known as direct healing) requires a correct anatomical reduction which is stable, without any gap formation. Such healing requires only the remodeling of lamellar bone, the Haversian canals and the blood vessels without callus formation. This process may take a few months to a few years.

=== Contact healing ===
When the gap between the bone ends is less than 0.01 mm, and interfragmentary strain is less than 2%, contact healing can occur. In this case, cutting cones, which consists of osteoclasts, form across the fracture lines, generating cavities at a rate of 50–100 μm/day. Osteoblasts fill up the cavities with the Haversian system. This causes the formation of lamellar bone that orients longitudinally along the long axis of the bone. Blood vessels form that penetrate the Haversian system. Remodelling of lamellar bone results in healing without callus formation.

=== Gap healing ===
If the fracture gap is less than 800 μm to 1 mm, the fracture is filled by osteoblasts and then by lamellar bone oriented perpendicular to the axis of the bone. This initial process takes three to eight weeks. Perpendicular orientation of lamellar bone is weak, thus a secondary osteonal reconstruction is required to re-orient the lamellar bone longitudinally.

== Secondary healing ==
Secondary healing (also known as indirect fracture healing) is the most common form of bone healing. It usually consists of only endochondral ossification. Sometimes, intramembranous ossification occurs together with endochondral ossification. Intramembranous ossification, mediated by the periosteal layer of bone, occurs with the formation of callus. For endochondral ossification, deposition of bone only occurs after the mineralised cartilage. This process of healing occurs when the fracture is treated conservatively using orthopaedic cast or immobilisation, external fixation, or internal fixation.

=== Reaction ===
After bone fracture, blood cells accumulate adjacent to the injury site. Soon after fracture, blood vessels constrict, stopping further bleeding. Within a few hours, the extravascular blood cells form a clot called a hematoma that acts as a template for callus formation. These cells, including macrophages, release inflammatory mediators such as cytokines (tumor necrosis factor alpha (TNFα), interleukin-1 family (IL-1), interleukin 6 (IL-6), 11 (IL-11), and 18 (IL-18)) and increase blood capillary permeability. Inflammation peaks by 24 hours and completes by seven days. Through tumor necrosis factor receptor 1 (TNFR1) and tumor necrosis factor receptor 2, TNFα mediates the differentiation of mesenchymal stem cell (originated from the bone marrow) into osteoblast and chondrocytes. Stromal cell-derived factor 1 (SDF-1) and CXCR4 mediate recruitment of mesenchymal stem cells. IL-1 and IL-6 are the most important cytokines for bone healing. IL-1 promotes formation of callus and of blood vessels. IL-6 promotes differentiation of osteoblasts and osteoclasts. All cells within the blood clot degenerate and die. Within this area, the fibroblasts replicate. Within 7–14 days, they form a loose aggregate of cells, interspersed with small blood vessels, known as granulation tissue. Osteoclasts move in to reabsorb dead bone ends, and other necrotic tissue is removed.

=== Repair ===
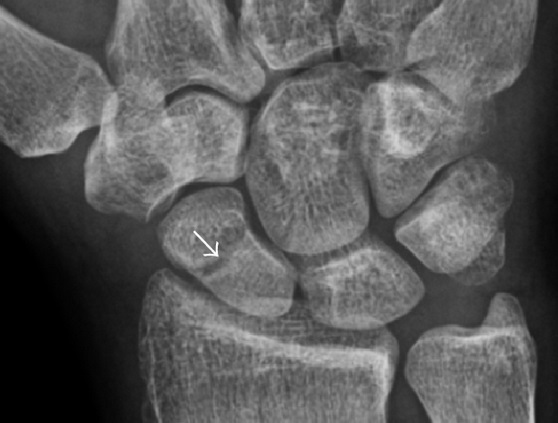
Radiolucency around a 12-day-old scaphoid fracture that was initially barely visible.

Seven to nine days after fracture, the cells of the periosteum replicate and transform. The periosteal cells proximal to (on the near side of) the fracture gap develop into chondroblasts, which form hyaline cartilage. The periosteal cells distal to (at the far end of) the fracture gap develop into osteoblasts, which form woven bone through bone resorption of calcified cartilage and recruitment of bone cells and osteoclasts. The fibroblasts within the granulation tissue develop into chondroblasts which also form hyaline cartilage. These two new tissues grow in size until they unite with each other. These processes culminate in a new mass of heterogeneous tissue known as a fracture callus. Callus formation peaks at day 14 of fracture. Eventually, the fracture gap is bridged.

The next phase is the replacement of the hyaline cartilage and woven bone with lamellar bone. The replacement process is known as endochondral ossification with respect to the hyaline cartilage and bony substitution with respect to the woven bone. Substitution of woven bone happens before substitution of hyaline cartilage. The lamellar bone begins forming soon after the collagen matrix of either tissue becomes mineralized. At this stage, the process is induced by IL-1 and TNFα. The mineralized matrix is penetrated by microvessel and numerous osteoblasts. The osteoblasts form new lamellar bone upon the recently exposed surface of the mineralized matrix. This new lamellar bone is in the form of trabecular bone. Eventually, all of the woven bone and cartilage of the original fracture callus is replaced by trabecular bone, restoring most of the bone's original strength.

=== Remodelling ===
Remodeling begins as early as three to four weeks after fracture and may take 3 to 5 years to complete. The process substitutes the trabecular bone with compact bone. The trabecular bone is first resorbed by osteoclasts, creating a shallow resorption pit known as a "Howship's lacuna". Then osteoblasts deposit compact bone within the resorption pit. Eventually, the fracture callus is remodelled into a new shape which closely duplicates the bone's original shape and strength. This process can be achieved by the formation of electrical polarity during partial weight bearing a long bone; where electropositive convex surface and electronegative concave surface activates osteoclasts and osteoblasts respectively. This process can be enhanced by certain synthetic injectable biomaterials, such as Cerament, which are osteoconductive and promote bone healing.

=== Obstructions ===
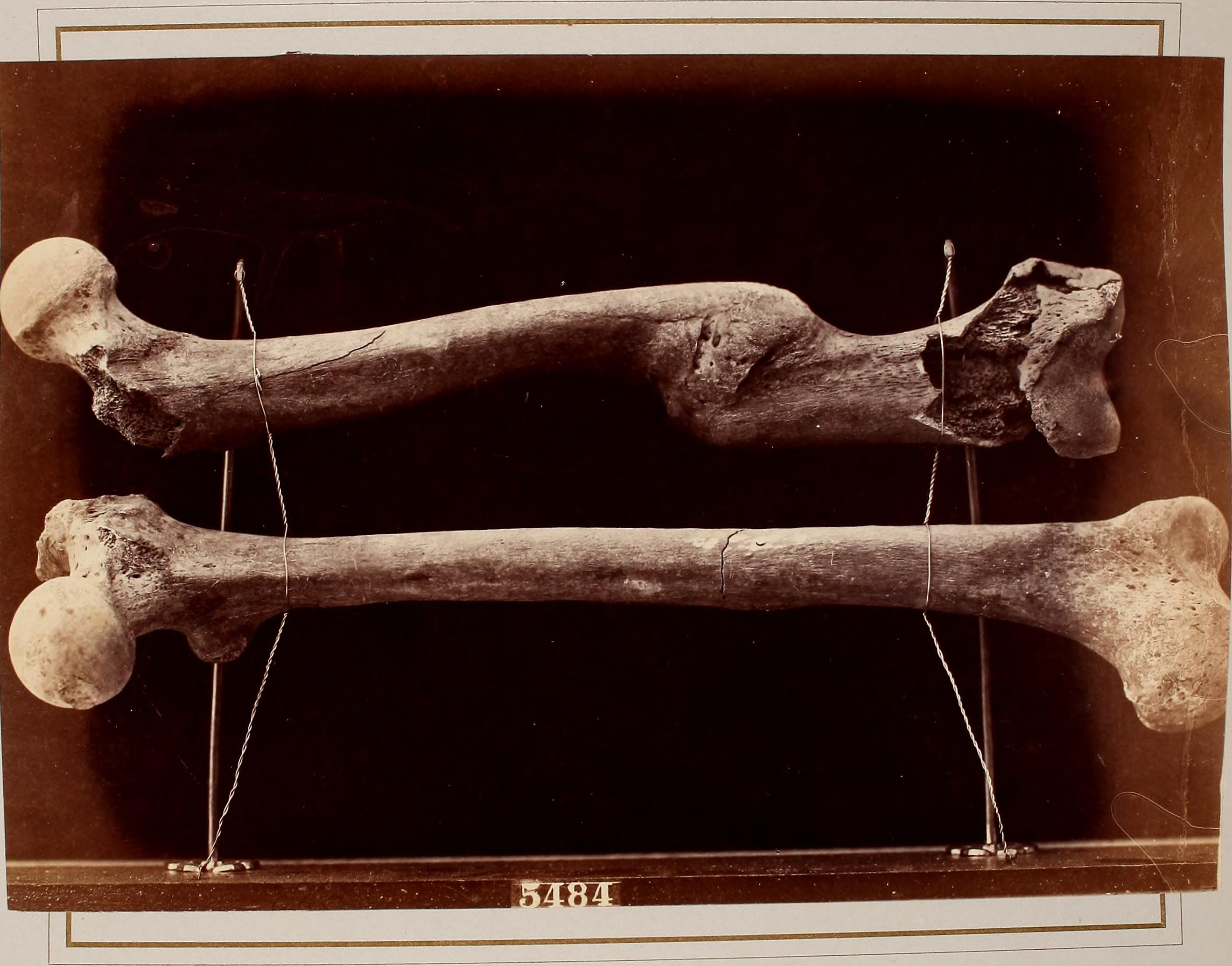
Femur (top) healed while improperly aligned

1. Poor blood supply which leads to the death of the osteocytes. Bone cell death also depends on degree of fracture and disruption to the Haversian system.
2. Condition of the soft tissues. Soft tissue between bone ends restricts healing.
3. Nutrition and drug therapy. Poor general health reduces healing rate. Drugs that impair the inflammatory response impede healing also.
4. Infection. Diverts the inflammatory response away from healing towards fighting off the infection.
5. Age. Young bone unites more rapidly than adult bone.
6. Pre-existing bone malignancy.
7. Mechanical factors such as the bone not being aligned, and too much or too little movement. Excess mobility can disrupt the bridging callus, interfering with union; but slight biomechanical motion is seen to improve callus formation.

=== Complications ===
Complications of fracture healing include:

1. Infection: this is the most common complication of fractures and predominantly occurs in open fractures. Post-traumatic wound infection is the most common cause of chronic osteomyelitis in patients. Osteomyelitis can also occur following surgical fixation of a fracture.
2. Non-union: no progression of healing within six months of a fracture occurring. The fracture pieces remain separated and can be caused by infection and/or lack of blood supply (Ischaemia) to the bone. There are two types of non-union, atrophic and hypertrophic. Hypertrophic involves the formation of excess callus leading to bone ends appearing sclerotic causing a radiological "Elephants Foot" appearance due to excessive fracture ends mobility but adequate blood supply. Atrophic non-union results in re-absorption and rounding of bone ends due to inadequate blood supply and excessive mobility of the bone ends.
3. Mal-union: healing occurs but the healed bone has 'angular deformity, translation, or rotational alignment that requires surgical correction'. This is most common in long bones such as the femur.
4. Delayed union: healing times vary depending on the location of a fracture and the age of a patient. Delayed union is characterised by 'persistence of the fracture line and a scarcity or absence of callus formation' on x-ray. Healing is still occurring but at a much slower rate than normal.

=== Gallery ===
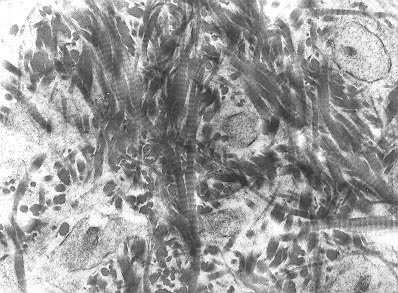
Collagen fibers of woven bone

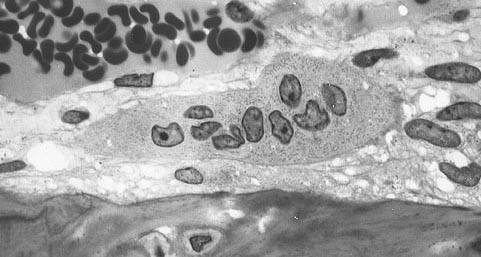
Osteoclast displaying many nuclei within its "foamy" cytoplasm.

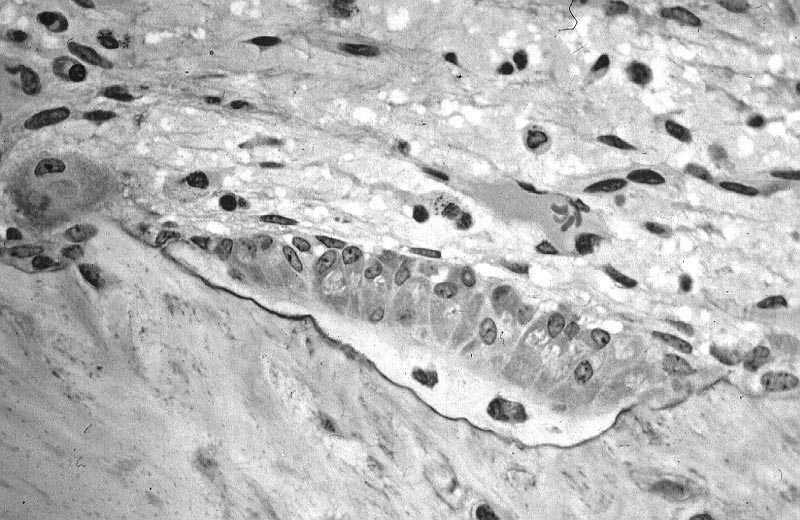
Light micrograph of decalcified cancellous bone displaying osteoblasts forming new bone tissue, containing two osteocytes, within a resorption pit.

=== Radiologic timeline in young children ===
On medical imaging, secondary bone healing displays the following features over time in young children:

Features and when they appear (and percentage of individuals having the feature in that period or at that time point)
| Resolution of soft tissues | 7–10 days (or 2–21 days) |
| Gap widening | 4–6 weeks (56%) |
| Periosteal reaction | 7 days – 7 weeks |
| Marginal sclerosis | 4–6 weeks (85%) |
| First callus | 4–7 weeks (100%) |
| Radiodensity of callus > cortex | 13 weeks (90%) |
| Bridging callus | 2.6 – 13 weeks |
| Periosteal incorporation | 14 weeks |
| Remodeling | 9 weeks (50%) |

== See also ==
- Craniofacial regeneration
