= Fibrocartilage callus =

Temporary formation in bone healing

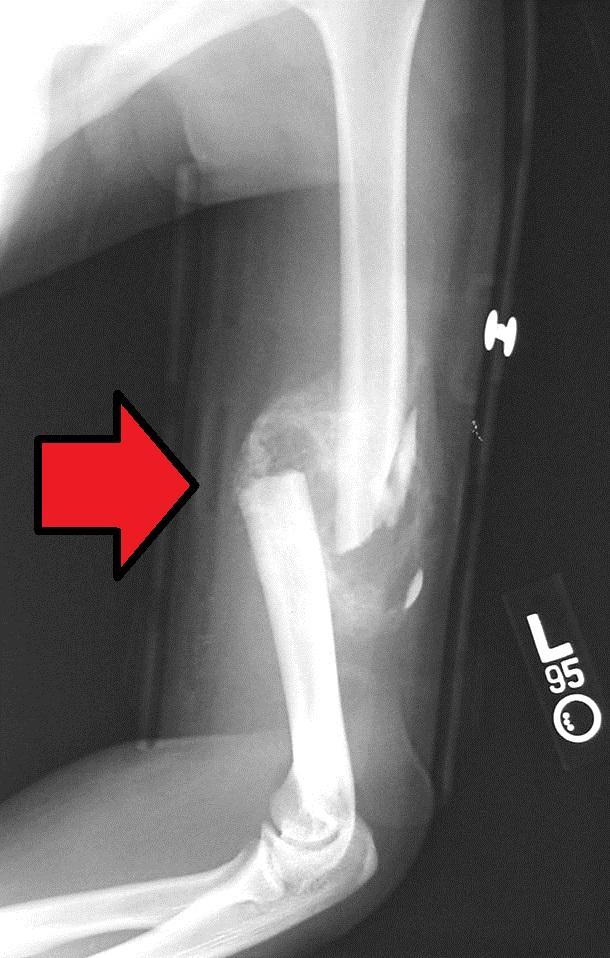
Comminuted midshaft humerus fracture with callus formation.

A fibrocartilage callus is a temporary formation of fibroblasts and chondroblasts which forms at the area of a bone fracture as the bone attempts to heal itself. The cells eventually dissipate and become dormant, lying in the resulting extracellular matrix that is the new bone. The callus is the first sign of union visible on x-rays, usually 3 weeks after the fracture. Callus formation is slower in adults than in children, and in cortical bones than in cancellous bones.

== See also ==
- Bone healing
