= Elastic cartilage =

Type of tissue

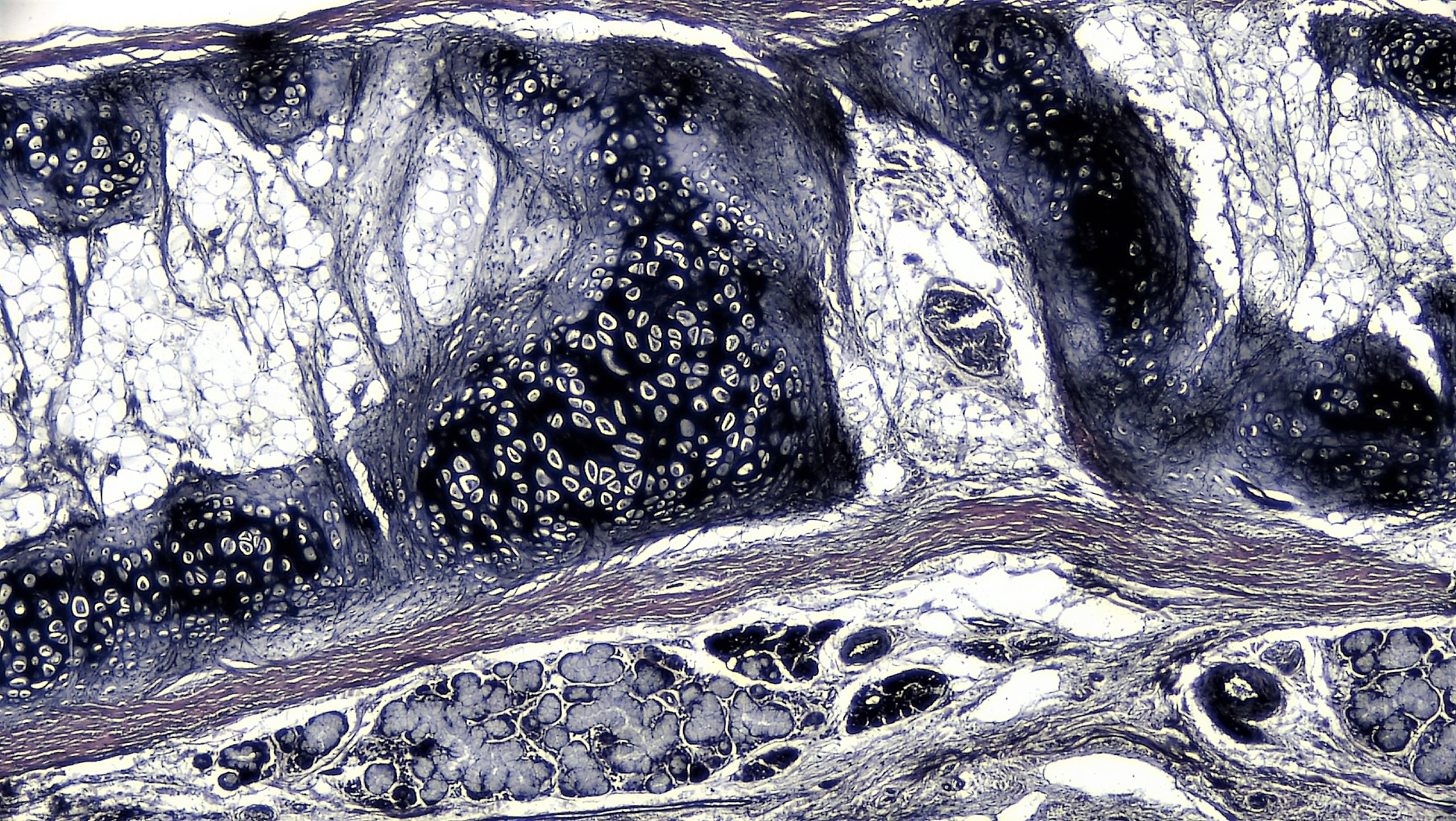
- A cross section of mammalian elastic cartilage

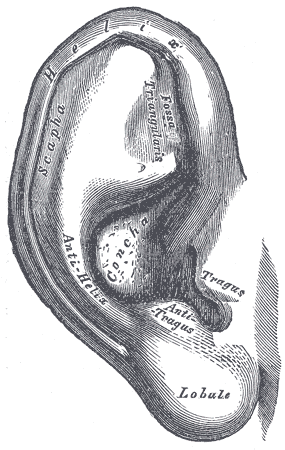
- Lateral side of the auricle

Details
- Part of: Outer ear, Eustachian tube and epiglottis

Identifiers
- Latin: cartilago elastica
- MeSH: D051472
- TH: H2.00.03.5.00018
- FMA: 64785

Elastic cartilage, fibroelastic cartilage or yellow fibrocartilage is a type of cartilage present in the pinnae (auricles) of the ear giving it shape, provides shape for the lateral region of the external auditory meatus, medial part of the auditory canal Eustachian tube, corniculate and cuneiform laryngeal cartilages, and the epiglottis. It contains elastic fiber networks and collagen type II fibers. The principal protein is elastin.

== Structure ==
Elastic cartilage is histologically similar to hyaline cartilage but contains many yellow elastic fibers lying in a solid matrix. These fibers form bundles that appear dark under a microscope. The elastic fibers require special staining since when it is stained using haematoxylin and eosin (H&E) stain it appears the same as hyaline cartilage. Verhoeff van Geison stains are used (giving the elastic fibers a black color), but aldehyde fuchsin stains, Weigert's elastic stains, and orcein stains also work. These fibers give elastic cartilage great flexibility so that it is able to withstand repeated bending. Similarly to hyaline one or multiple chondrocytes lie between the spaces (or lacunae) in the fibres. The chondrocytes only make up 2% of the tissue's volume. Chondrocytes and the extracellular matrix are contained in an outerlayer named the perichondrium (which is a layer of dense irregular connective tissue that surrounds cartilage which is independent of the joint). It is found in the epiglottis (part of the larynx), and the pinnae (the external ear flaps of many mammals). Elastin fibers stain dark purple/black with Verhoeff's stain.

The extracellular matrix contains elastin, fibrillin, glycoproteins, collagen types II, IX, X, and XI, and the proteoglycan aggrecan. the components within the extracellular matrix are produced by the chondroblasts located within the edges of the perichondrium.

Elastic fibers within the extracellular matrix are made up of elastin proteins which co-polymerize with fibrillin forming fiber-like elastic chains. When the elastic fibers are relaxed the elastic chains appear disorganized, when tensile pressure is give the elastic chains appear organized and return to a disorganized state when the pressure is released.

Collagen fibers form networks to provide strength and structural framework for the molecules within the extracellular matrix.

== Function ==
The main function of elastic cartilage is to provide support and maintain shape in response to tension, compression, and bending.

== See also ==
List of distinct cell types in the adult human body
