= Periodontal ligament stem cells =

Periodontal ligament stem cells or periodontal membrane stem cells are stem cells found near the periodontal ligament of the teeth. These cells have shown potential in the regeneration of not only the periodontal complex but also other dental and non-dental tissues. They are involved in adult regeneration of the periodontal ligament, alveolar bone, and cementum. The cells are known to express STRO-1 and CD146 proteins.

Periodontal ligament stem cells play a role as progenitor cells. They are capable of generating into osteoblasts, cementoblasts, chondrocytes, and adipocytes.
