= Endosteum =

Thin vascular membrane

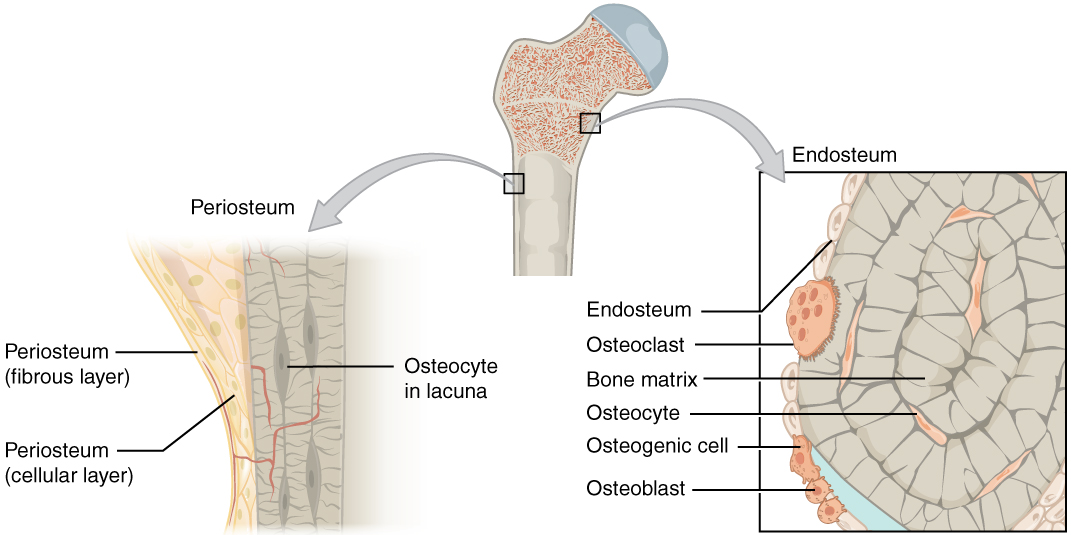
- Endosteum covers the inside of bones, and surrounds the medullary cavity.

Identifiers
- TA98: A02.0.00.038
- TA2: 387
- TH: H2.00.03.7.00022
- FMA: 32692

The endosteum (pl.: endostea) is a thin vascular membrane of connective tissue that lines the inner surface of the bony tissue that forms the medullary cavity of long bones.

This endosteal surface is usually resorbed during long periods of malnutrition, resulting in less cortical thickness.

The outer surface of a bone is lined by a thin layer of connective tissue that is very similar in morphology and function to endosteum. It is called the periosteum, or the periosteal surface. During bone growth, the width of the bone increases as osteoblasts lay new bone tissue at the periosteum. To prevent the bone from becoming unnecessarily thick, osteoclasts resorb the bone from the endosteal side.

== Additional images ==
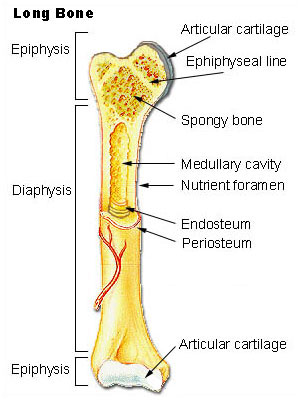
Long bone
