= Endochondral ossification =

Cartilaginous bone development that forms the long bones

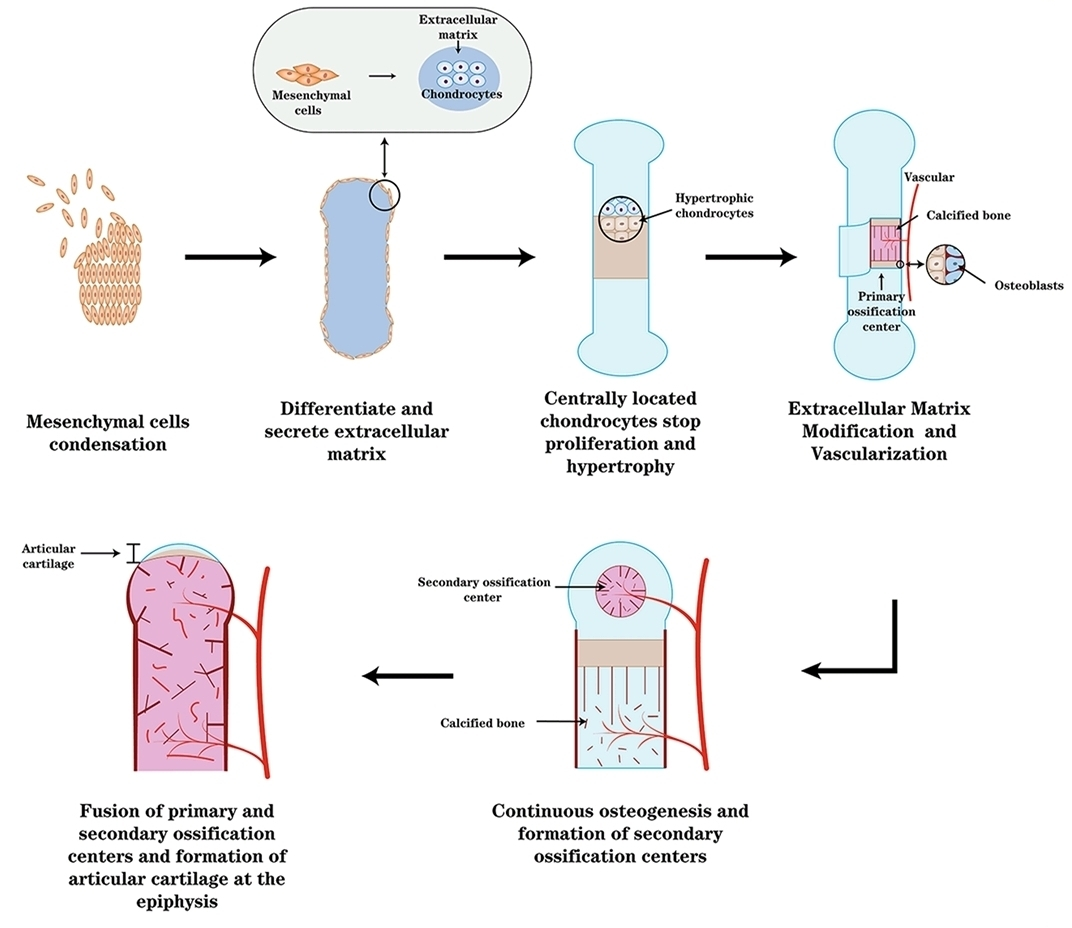
- A schematic representation of endochondral ossification.

Endochondral ossification is one of the essential pathways by which bone tissue is produced during fetal development and bone repair of the mammalian skeletal system, the other pathways being intramembranous ossification and ectochondral ossification. Both endochondral and intramembranous processes initiate from a precursor mesenchymal tissue, but their transformations into bone are different. In intramembranous ossification, mesenchymal tissue is directly converted into bone. On the other hand, endochondral ossification starts with mesenchymal tissue turning into an intermediate cartilage stage, which is eventually substituted by bone.

Ectochondral ossification can occur in membranes surrounding cartilage when endochondral bone initiates in the cartilage and invades the membrane, causing growth beyond the original shape of the cartilage.

Endochondral ossification is responsible for development of most bones including long and short bones, the bones of the axial (ribs and vertebrae) and the appendicular skeleton (e.g. upper and lower limbs), the bones of the chondrocranium and splanchnocranium, and the medial end of the clavicle. In addition, endochondral ossification is not exclusively confined to embryonic development; it also plays a crucial role in the healing of fractures.

== Formation of the cartilage model ==
The initiation of endochondral ossification starts by proliferation and condensation of mesenchymal cells in the area where the bone will eventually be formed. Subsequently, these mesenchymal progenitor cells differentiate into chondroblasts, which actively synthesize cartilage matrix components. Thus, the initial hyaline cartilage template is formed, which has the same basic shape and outline as the future bone.

This hyaline cartilage template expands through both:
	Interstitial growth	Appositional growth
Cellular protagonists	Chondrocytes present within the existing cartilage.	Chondroblasts that develop from the perichondrium.
Mechanism	Chondrocytes proliferate and lay down matrix.	Chondroblasts differentiate into chondrocytes and lay down matrix.
Site of expansion	From within.	From the external surface of existing cartilage.
Outcome	Increase in length.	Increase in width and thickness.

== Primary center of ossification ==
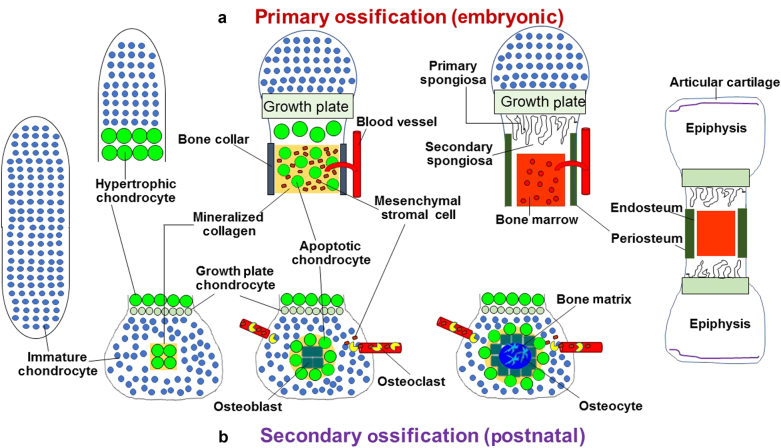
A schematic for long bone endochondral ossification.

Histology of endochondral ossification of a vertebral processes at 11 weeks of gestational age, H&E stain. The left side contains hyaline cartilage, with the extracellular matrix becoming calcified towards the right side.

In developing bones, ossification commences within the primary ossification center located in the center of the diaphysis (bone shaft), where the following changes occur:

1. The perichondrium surrounding the cartilage model transforms into the periosteum. During this transformation, special cells within the perichondrium switch gears. Instead of becoming cartilage cells (chondrocytes), they mature into bone-building osteoblasts. This newly formed bone can be called "periosteal bone" as it originates from the transformed periosteum. However, considering its developmental pathway, it could be classified as "intramembranous bone".
2. After the formation of the periosteum, chondrocytes in the primary center of ossification begin to grow (hypertrophy). They begin secreting:
  - Collagen type X, which causes stiffness and compression of the extracellular matrix.
  - Matrix metalloproteinases.
  - Vascular endothelial growth factor (VEGF), which controls forthcoming vascular invasion.
  - Alkaline phosphatase, which causes calcification of the cartilage matrix. This calcification prevents passage of nutrients to chondrocytes leading to their death.
3. When chondrocytes die, matrix metalloproteinases result in catabolism of various components within the extracellular matrix and the physical boundaries between neighboring lacunae (the spaces housing chondrocytes) weaken. This can lead to the merging of these lacunae, creating larger empty spaces.
4. Blood vessels arising from the periosteum invade these empty spaces and mesenchymal stem cells migrate guided by penetrating blood vessels. Following the invading blood vessels, mesenchymal stem cells reach these empty spaces and undergo differentiation into osteoprogenitor cells. These progenitors further mature into osteoblasts, that deposit unmineralized bone matrix, termed osteoid. Mineralization subsequently follows leading to formation of bone trabeculae (Endochondral bone formation).

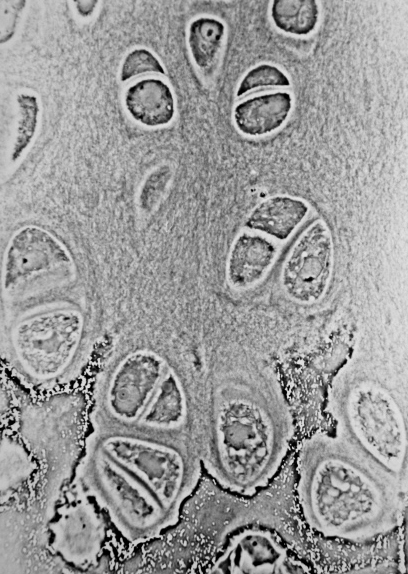
Light micrograph of undecalcified epiphyseal plate showing endochondral ossification: healthy chondrocytes (top) become degenerating ones (bottom), characteristically displaying a calcified extracellular matrix.

== Secondary center of ossification ==
During the postnatal life, a secondary ossification center appears in each end (epiphysis) of long bones. In these secondary centers, cartilage is converted to bone similarly to that occurring in a primary ossification center. As the secondary ossification centers enlarge, residual cartilage persists in two distinct locations:

- Articular cartilage: This layer coats the bone ends, concerned with joint movement.
- Epiphyseal growth plate: This transverse layer lies between the epiphysis and diaphysis. It's composed of highly active chondrocytes and responsible for longitudinal bone growth. Consequently, the bone elongates at this growth plate until closure occurs at skeletal maturity.

At the end of an individual's growth period, the production of new cartilage in the epiphyseal plate stops. After this point, existing cartilage within the plate turns into mature bone tissue.

== Histology ==
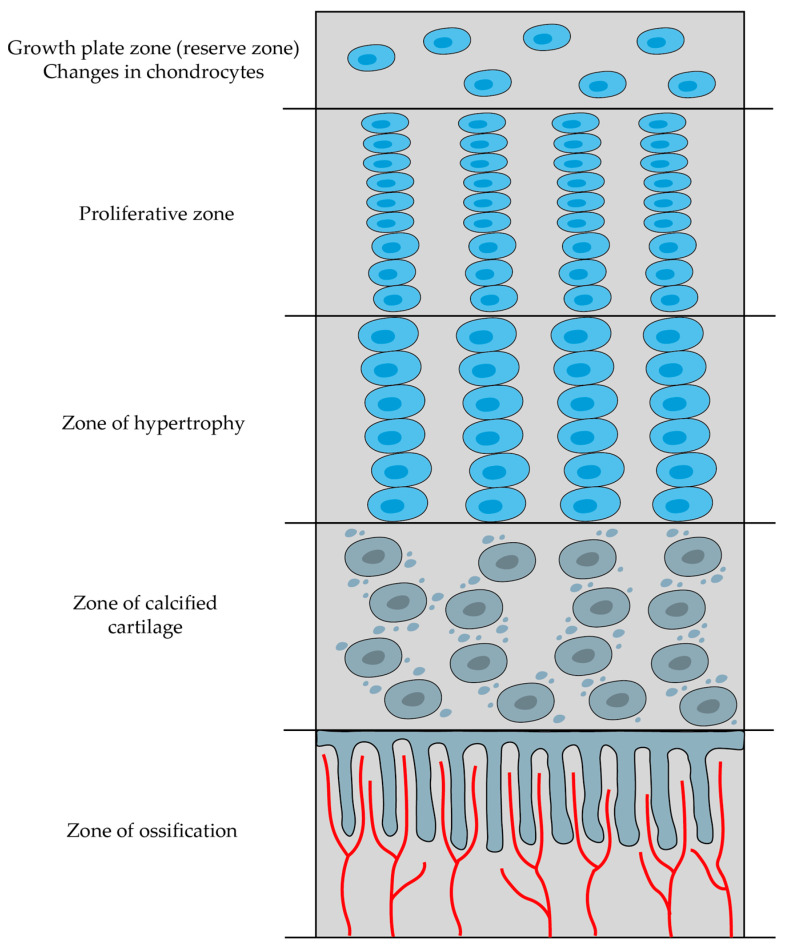
Zones of endochondral ossification.

During endochondral ossification, five distinct zones can be seen at the light-microscope level. However, their nomenclature and histological boundaries are debated.

Name	Definition
Zone of reserve / resting cartilage	This zone contains normal, resting hyaline cartilage.
Zone of proliferation / cell columns	In this zone, chondrocytes undergo rapid mitosis, forming distinctive looking columns.
Zone of maturation / hypertrophy	In this zone, the chondrocytes undergo hypertrophy (become enlarged). Chondrocytes contain large amounts of glycogen and begin to secrete vascular endothelial growth factor to initiate vascular invasion.
Zone of calcification / calcified cartilage	In this zone, chondrocytes are either dying or dead, leaving cavities that will later become invaded by bone-forming cells. Chondrocytes here die when they can no longer receive nutrients or eliminate wastes via diffusion. This is because the calcified matrix is much less hydrated than hyaline cartilage.
Zone of ossification	Osteoprogenitor cells invade the area and differentiate into osteoblasts, which elaborate matrix that becomes calcified on the surface of calcified cartilage.

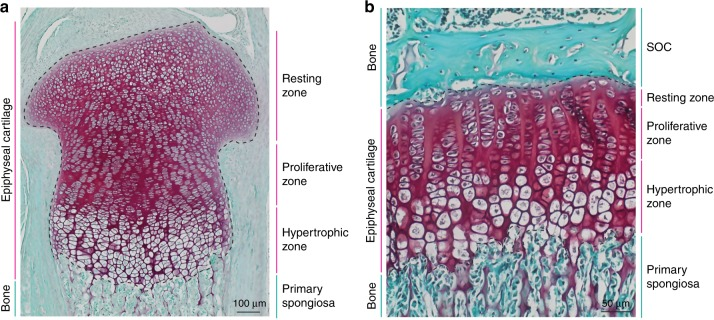

== Fracture healing ==
For complete recovery of a fractured bone's biomechanical functionality, the bone healing process needs to culminate in the formation of lamellar bone at the fracture site to withstand the same forces and stresses it did before the fracture. Indirect fracture healing, the most common type of bone repair, relies heavily on endochondral ossification. In this type of healing, endochondral ossification occurs within the fracture gap and external to the periosteum. In contrast, intramembranous ossification takes place directly beneath the periosteum, adjacent to the broken bone's ends.

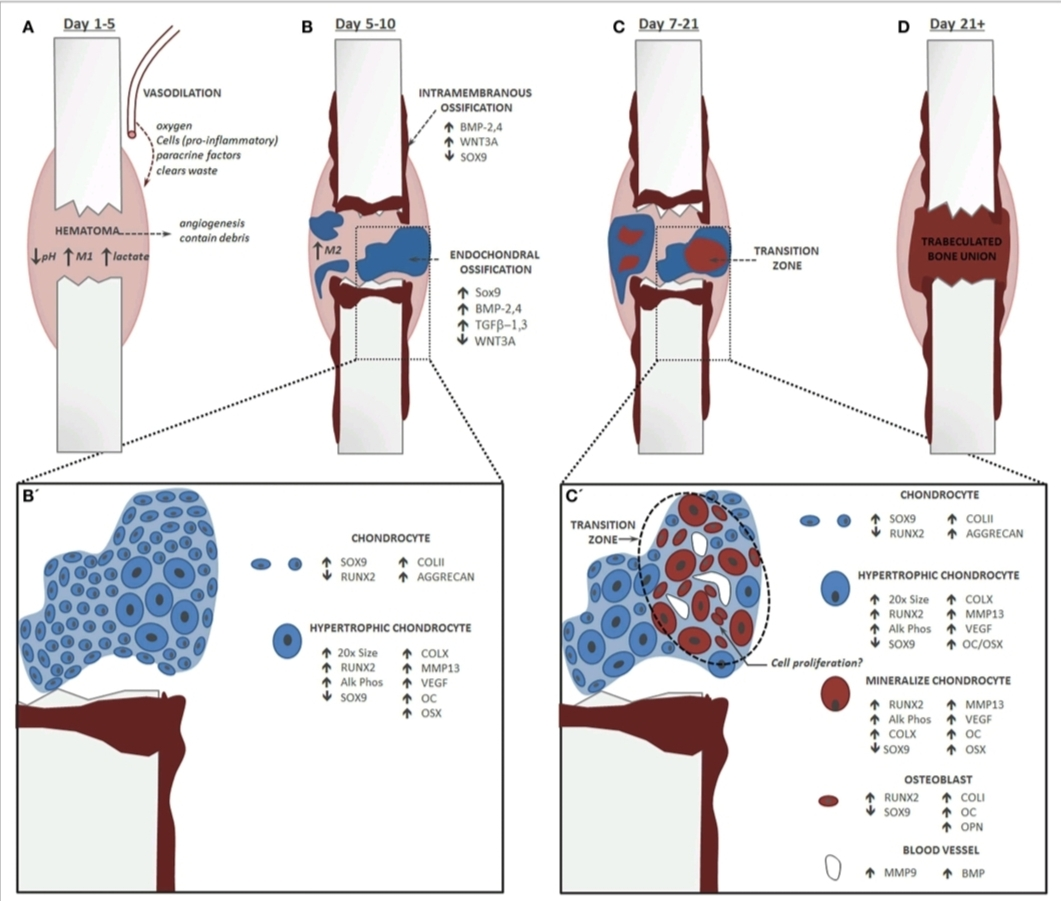
A schematic of endochondral fracture, where B shows the location of both endochondral and intramembranous ossification.

== Additional images ==
Histology of endochondral ossification at 11 weeks of gestational age, with cartilage at left gradually becoming bone at right. H&E stain.

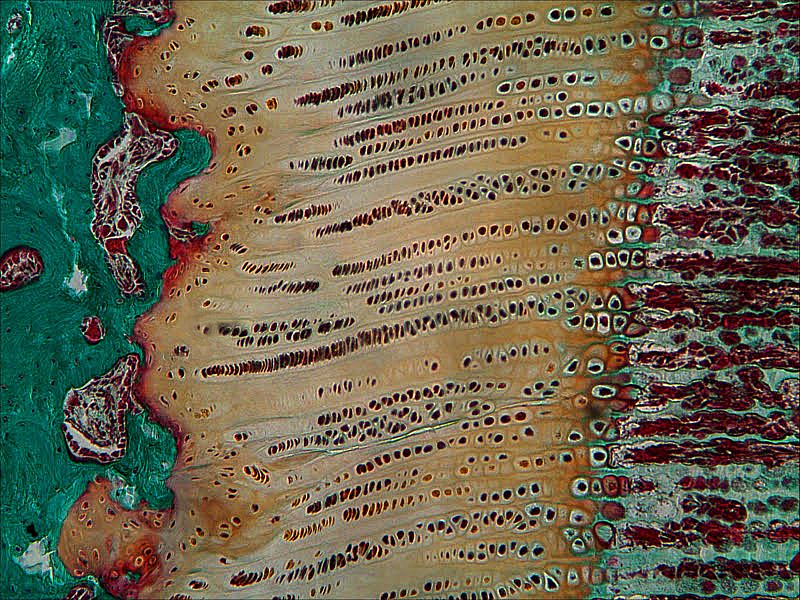
Masson Goldner trichrome stain of growth plate in a rabbit tibia.

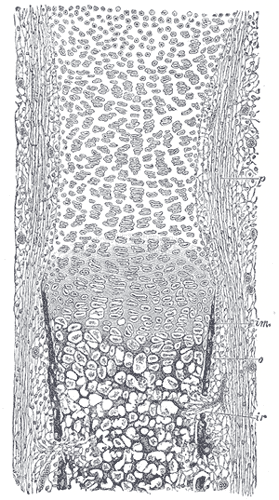
Section of fetal bone of cat. ir. Irruption of the subperiosteal tissue. p. Fibrous layer of the periosteum. o. Layer of osteoblasts. im. Subperiosteal bony deposit.

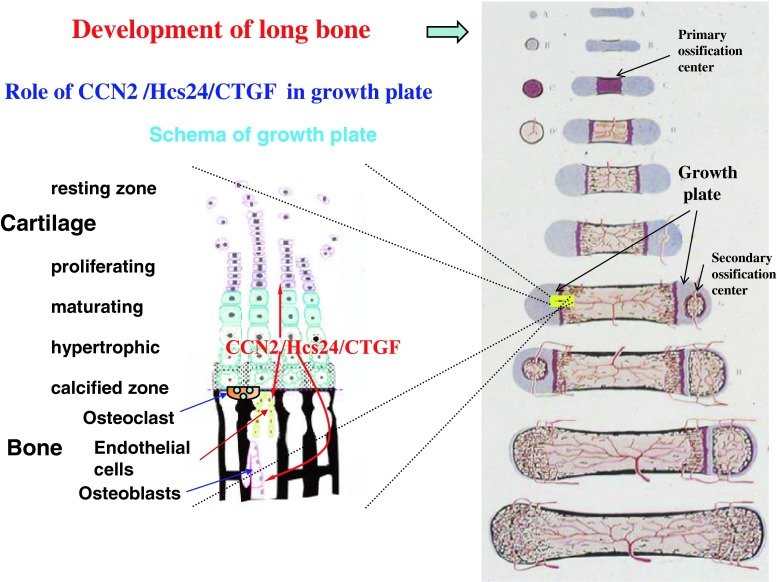
Process of endochondral ossification.

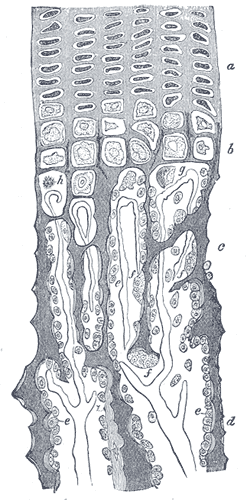
Drawing of part of a longitudinal section of the developing femur of a rabbit. a. Flattened cartilage cells. b. Enlarged cartilage cells. c, d. Newly formed bone. e. Osteoblasts. f. Giant cells or osteoclasts. g, h. Shrunken cartilage cells.
