= Medullary cavity =

Area inside a bone where marrow is stored

Medullary Cavity
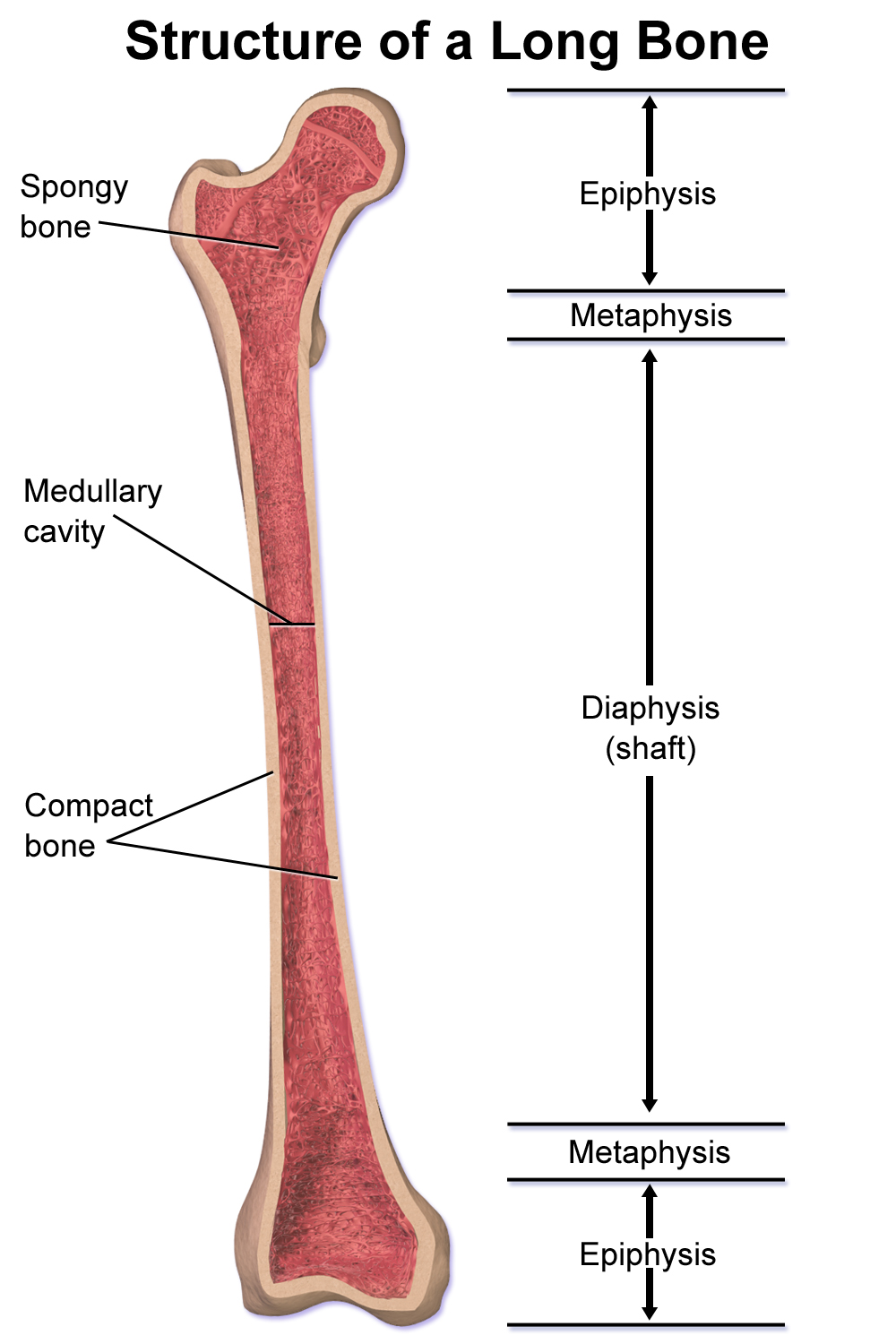
- A long bone, with medullary cavity labeled near center.

Details

Identifiers
- Latin: cavitas medullaris
- TA98: A02.0.00.037
- TA2: 386
- FMA: 83698

The medullary cavity (medulla, innermost part) is the central cavity of bone shafts where red bone marrow and/or yellow bone marrow (adipose tissue) is stored; hence, the medullary cavity is also known as the marrow cavity.

Located in the main shaft of a long bone (diaphysis) (consisting mostly of spongy bone), the medullary cavity has walls composed of compact bone (cortical bone) and is lined with a thin, vascular membrane (endosteum).

Intramedullary is a medical term meaning the inside of a bone. Examples include intramedullary rods used to treat bone fractures in orthopedic surgery and intramedullary tumors occurring in some forms of cancer or benign tumors such as an enchondroma.

== Comparative anatomy ==
This area is involved in the formation of red blood cells and white blood cells.

In some dinosaurs, reptiles, and birds, a medullary bone grows here, which supplies the calcium supply for eggshells. This has been detected in fossil bones despite the fossilization process. It is not found in crocodiles or reptiles.
