= Perichondrium =

Layer of connective tissue surrounding cartilage

Details
- Location: Developing bone

Identifiers
- Latin: perichondrium
- TA98: A02.0.00.008
- TA2: 385
- TH: H2.00.03.5.00019
- FMA: 75446

The perichondrium (from Greek περί, peri, 'around' and χόνδρος, chondros, 'cartilage') is a layer of dense irregular connective tissue that surrounds the cartilage of developing bone. It consists of two separate layers: an outer fibrous layer and inner chondrogenic layer. The fibrous layer contains fibroblasts, which produce collagenous fibres. The chondrogenic layer remains undifferentiated and can form chondroblasts. Perichondrium can be found around the perimeter of elastic cartilage and hyaline cartilage.

Perichondrium is a type of irregular collagenous ordinary connective tissue, and also functions in the growth and repair of cartilage. Perichondrium contains type I collagen and type XII collagen.
