= Chondroblast =

Mesenchymal progenitor cell that forms a chondrocyte

- Diagram of chondroblasts

Details

Identifiers
- Latin: chondroblastus
- TH: H2.00.03.5.00002
- FMA: 66783

Chondroblasts, or perichondrial cells, is the name given to mesenchymal progenitor cells in situ which, from endochondral ossification, will form chondrocytes in the growing cartilage matrix. Another name for them is subchondral cortico-spongious progenitors. They have euchromatic nuclei and stain by basic dyes.

These cells are extremely important in chondrogenesis due to their role in forming both the chondrocytes and cartilage matrix which will eventually form cartilage. Use of the term is technically inaccurate since mesenchymal progenitors can also technically differentiate into osteoblasts or fat. Chondroblasts are called chondrocytes when they embed themselves in the cartilage matrix, consisting of proteoglycan and collagen fibers, until they lie in the matrix lacunae. Once they embed themselves into the cartilage matrix, they grow the cartilage matrix by growing more cartilage extracellular matrix rather than by dividing further.

== Structure ==
Within adults and developing adults, most chondroblasts are located in the perichondrium. This is a thin layer of connective tissue which protects cartilage and is where chondroblasts help to expand cartilage size whenever prompted to by hormones such as GH, TH, and glycosaminoglycans. They are located on the perichondrium because the perichondrium, located on the outside of developing bone, is not as heavily ensheathed in cartilage extracellular matrix as the interior and because here capillaries are located. The type of growth maintained by chondroblasts is called appositional bone growth and increases the girth of the affected tissue. Perichondrium, and thus chondroblasts, are not found on the articular cartilage surfaces of joints.

=== Matrix formation and composition ===
The extracellular matrix secreted by chondroblasts is composed of fibers, collagen, hyaluronic acid, proteoglycans, glycoproteins, water, and a host of macromolecules. Within finished cartilage, collagen fibers compose 10-20% of the volume, water 65-80%, and the proteoglycan-hyaluronic acid aggregates the remaining portion. Due to the proliferative nature of chondroblasts, cells compose a larger portion of the composition than what is normally found within completed cartilage.

Collagen Type II fibers are responsible for giving the future cartilage matrix its tensile strength. The structure of these fibers, like the majority of collagen fibers, forms a triple helix structure.

Proteoglycans resist the compression generally put upon cartilage and generate the swelling pressure responsible for stress shielding the matrix from compression loading. They attach themselves to up to 100 Chondroitin sulfate molecules and up to 50 keratan sulfate glycoaminoglycan chains. These chains together are attached to a hyaluronic acid backbone which, in conjunction with the collagen fibrils, create an interstitial intrafibrillar space in which water is held in by the negative charge of the proteoglycans.

== Development ==
As suggested in the name, mesenchymal progenitors originate from the mesoderm. These cells, when forming from the mesoderm, specifically form from embryonic stem cells via induction through BMP4 and fibroblast growth factor FGF2 while the fetus is inside the womb. It has been suggested that differentiating embryonic stem cells with these growth factors could prevent stem cells, once injected into potential patients, from forming teratomas, or stem cell caused tumors.

=== Signaling, transcription and environmental factors responsible for chondroblast creation ===
==== Transcription factors ====
An important genetic component of this process is Sox9, a HMG box transcription factor, which marks progenitor cells for chondrogenic differentiation. Inactivation of the Sox9 gene will result in the loss of all Cartilage, and thus Chondroblast, formation. This factor is also expressed alongside Sox5 and Sox6.

Runx2 is another important genetic component of Chondroblast formation. It has been found that expressing this gene will result in the suppression of the differentiation of chondroblasts. Expression of this gene will also prompt already formed cartilage to undergo endochondral ossification which will prompt the cartilage to form bone.

These genes are not the only factors which determine whether chondroblasts will form. General inactivation or activation of these gene doesn't turn all affected cells into one type or another. Extrinsic environmental factors act upstream in determining what cell type will form out of any particular mesenchymal progenitor cell.

==== Wnt/β-catenin signaling ====
Wnt14 is controlled by Col2a1 and is put through the β-Catenin mediated Wnt pathway. Higher levels of Wnt14 prevented chondrocyte differentiation whereas lower levels appeared to allow it. If the Wnt/ β-Catenin pathway is upregulated, then endochondral ossification is encouraged which promotes ossification of the formed cartilage. This pathway is a canonical Wnt pathway because of the β-Catenin that accumulates once Wnt14 signalling is initiated. After Wnt14 is initiated, phosphorylation of the β-Catenin that would normally mark the protein for destruction is suppressed which allows it to accumulate and eventually go into the cell nucleus to bind to the LEF/TCF transcription factors which lead both to the destruction of any remaining phosphorylated β-Catenin as well as the differentiation of mesenchymal progenitor cells into osteoblasts.

Testing of this pathway has indicated that the Wnt/β-Catenin increases β-Catenin levels before the activation of the Runx2 and Osx transcription factors which seems to suggest that early β-Catenin levels can be a sign of whether an early mesenchymal progenitor cell will progress to a chondrocyte or to an osteoblast.

==== Retinoic acid ====
Retinoic acid, part of a family of molecules called retinoids, need to be repressed in order for Chondroblasts to form. A 2003 study using transgenic mice with a weak, constitutively active retinoic acid receptor found that retinoids maintain cells within condensations in a prechondrogenic, mesenchymal cell state which prevents cell differentiation. It has also been suggested that the inhibition of receptor mediated retinoid signaling induces Sox9 expression which is considered a “master switch” for the differentiation of chondroblasts.

==== Environmental factors ====
Differentiation of chondroblasts is favored in an environment with high compressive force and low partial oxygen pressure which combine to inhibit protein 3, a protein which inhibits cartilage differentiation. These preferences are important since mature cartilage tissue is avascular and thus would be ill-suited to a high oxygen environment.

== Function ==
Chondroblasts appear to migrate to cartilage whenever chondrocytes are destroyed via mechanical force. Remaining chondrocytes divide in order to form more chondroblasts. HMGB-1, a growth factor which promotes chondrocyte division while receptors for advanced glycation products (RAGE) mediated chemotaxis to clean up cell debris resulting from the damage. Chondroblasts then secrete cartilage matrix around themselves in order to reform the lost cartilage tissue.

However, regeneration is still too slow for patient care to effectively rely on this mechanism of repair. Part of this inability to regenerate quickly from injury results from the relative avascular nature of cartilage as compared to other connective tissues of the human body.

== Pathology ==
Chondroblastomas can sometimes form, which are benign tumors that form at the sites of endochondral ossification due to over stimulation of the chondroblasts. When they form, they are usually found on the upper or lower tibia as well as the upper humerus where chondroblast activity is most apparent. Rarely, they can be found on the feet, hands, flat bones, or spine. 30–50% of these sarcomas have an accompanying osteoblastoma which is similarly benign.

Chondrosarcoma is a more malignant type of tumor, but most are low grade tumors and often appear in the axial skeletal region. It constitutes 20% of skeletal system tumors in the United States.

== See also ==
- List of human cell types derived from the germ layers
