= Osteon =

Fundamental anatomical unit of compact bone

- Diagram of compact bone from a transverse section of a long bone's cortex.

Details

Identifiers
- Latin: Osteon
- MeSH: D006253

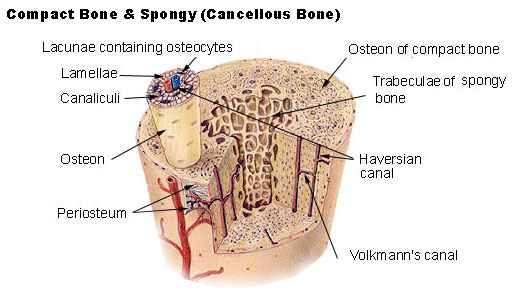
Diagram of a typical long bone showing both compact (cortical) and cancellous (spongy) bone.

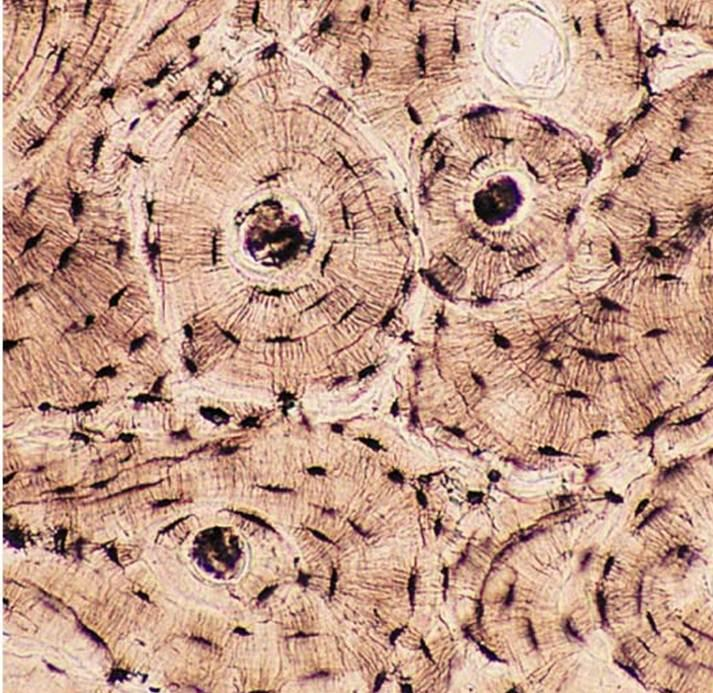
Osteons on cross-section of a bone

In osteology, the osteon or haversian system (/həˈvɜːr.ʒən/; named for Clopton Havers) is the fundamental functional unit of much compact bone. Osteons are roughly cylindrical structures that are typically between 0.25 mm and 0.35 mm in diameter. Their length is often hard to define, but estimates vary from several millimeters to around 1 centimeter. They are present in many bones of most mammals and some bird, reptile, and amphibian species.

== Histogenesis ==
The Haversian system forms during the process of endochondral ossification, which starts with a cartilage template that is gradually replaced by bone tissue. Osteoblasts, the bone-forming cells, secrete the organic components of bone matrix [osteoid] and then initiate its mineralization. As osteoblasts become surrounded by the bone matrix, they differentiate into osteocytes, which reside in the lacunae and maintain bone tissue. The osteocytes connect to each other and the Haversian canal via tiny canals called canaliculi.

== Structure ==
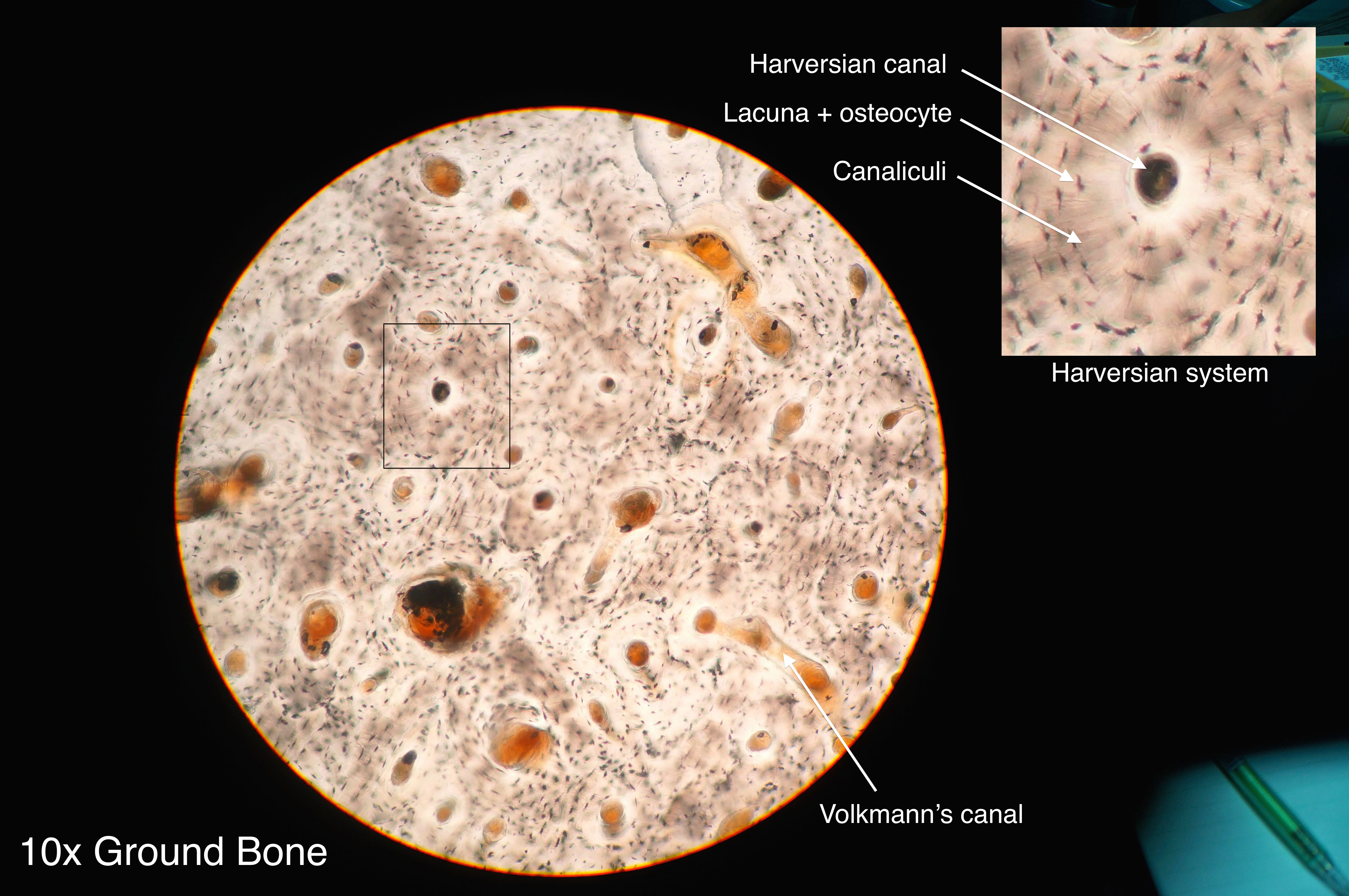
Histology of compact bone showing osteon

Each osteon consists of concentric layers, or lamellae, of compact bone tissue that surround a central canal, the Haversian canal. The Haversian canal contains the bone's blood supplies. The boundary of an osteon is the cement line.

Each Haversian canal is surrounded by varying number (5-20) of concentrically arranged lamellae of bone matrix. Near the surface of the compact bone, the lamellae are arranged parallel to the surface; these are called circumferential lamellae. Some of the osteoblasts develop into osteocytes, each living within its own small space, or lacuna. Osteocytes make contact with the cytoplasmic processes of their counterparts via a network of small transverse canals, or canaliculi. This network facilitates the exchange of nutrients and metabolic waste. Collagen fibers in a particular lamella run parallel to each other, but the orientation of collagen fibers within other lamellae is oblique. The collagen fiber density is lowest at the seams between lamellae, accounting for the distinctive microscopic appearance of a transverse section of osteons. The space between osteons is occupied by interstitial lamellae, which are the remnants of osteons that were partially resorbed during the process of bone remodeling.

Osteons are connected to each other and the periosteum by oblique channels called Volkmann's canals or perforating canals.

=== Drifting osteons ===
Drifting osteons are a phenomenon that is not fully understood. A "drifting osteon" is classified as one that runs both longitudinally as well as transversely through the cortex. An osteon can "drift" in one direction or change directions several times, leaving a tail of lamella behind the advancing haversian canal.

== Investigative applications ==
In bioarchaeological research and in forensic investigations, osteons in a bone fragment can be used to determine the sex of an individual and age, as well as aspects of taxonomy, diet, health and motor history.

Osteons and their arrangement vary according to taxon, so that genus and sometimes species can be differentiated using a bone fragment not otherwise identifiable. However, there is considerable variability among the different bones of a skeleton, and features of some faunal osteons overlap with those of human osteons; therefore, examination of osteons is not of primary use in the analyses of osteological remains. More research is needed, but osteohistology has the potential to positively affect the studies in bioarchaeology, paleontology and forensic investigations.

In recent decades, osteohistological studies of dinosaur fossils have been used to address a number of issues, such as the periodicity of growth of dinosaurs and whether it was uniform across species and the question of whether dinosaurs were warm-blooded or not.

== See also ==
- Cancellous bone (spongy bone)
- Cortical bone (compact bone)

== Bibliography ==
- Cooper, Reginald R.; Milgram, James W.; Robinson, Robert A. (1966). "Morphology of the Osteon: An Electron Microscopic Study". Journal of Bone and Joint Surgery. 48 (7): 1239–1271. doi:10.2106/00004623-196648070-00001. PMID 5921783.
- Netter, Frank H. (1987), Musculature system: anatomy, physiology, and metabolic disorders. Summit, New Jersey: Chiba-Geiger Corporation ISBN 0-914168-88-6
