= Volkmann's canal =

Channels in bones for blood vessels

Volkmann's canals
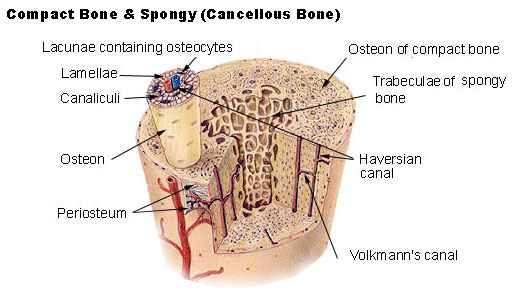
- Illustrated cross section of a long bone. Volkmann's canal labeled at bottom right.

Volkmann's canals, also known as perforating holes or channels, are anatomic arrangements in cortical bones that allow blood vessels to enter the bones from periosteum. They interconnect the Haversian canals (running inside osteons) with each other and the periosteum. They usually run at obtuse angles to the Haversian canals (which run the length of the bone) and contain anastomosing vessels between haversian capillaries. They were named after German physiologist Alfred Volkmann (1800–1878).

The perforating canals, with the blood vessels, provide energy and nourishing elements for osteons.

== Additional images ==
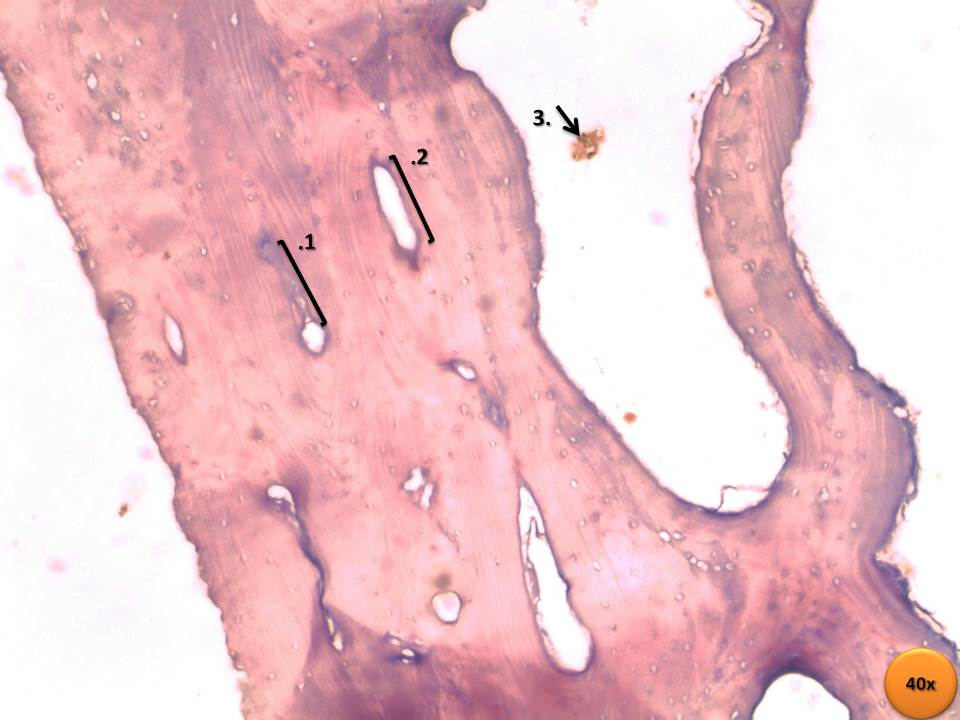
Bone by decalcification (40x):
1. Volkmann's canal
2. Haversian canal
3. Blood vessel

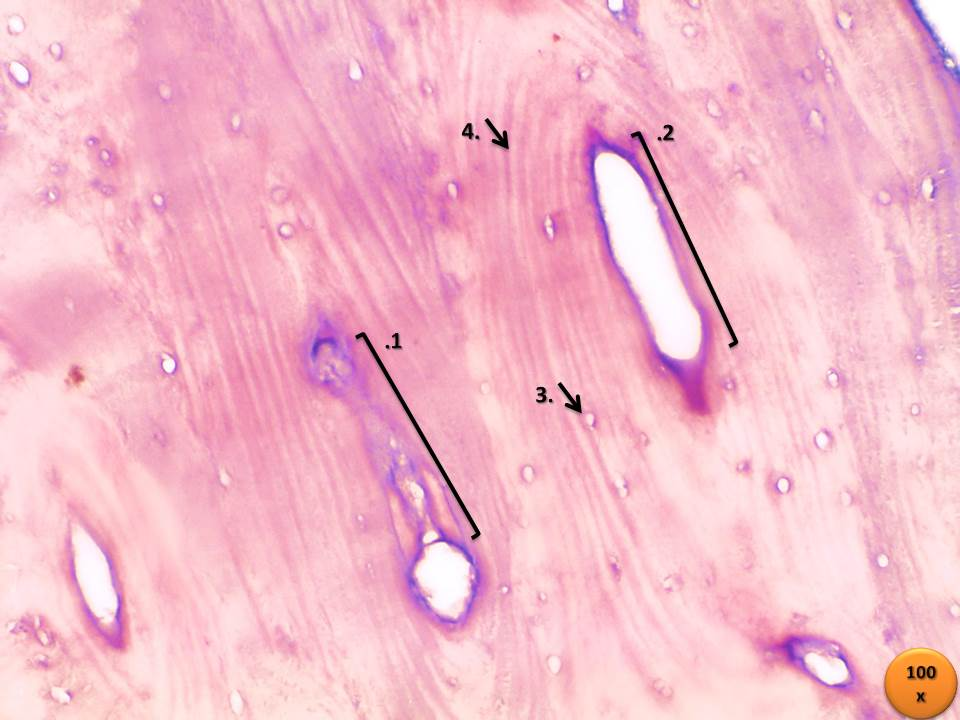
Bone by decalcification (100x):
1. Volkmann's canal
2. Haversian canal
3. Lacunae
4. Lamellae
