= Bone mineral =

Inorganic component of bone tissue

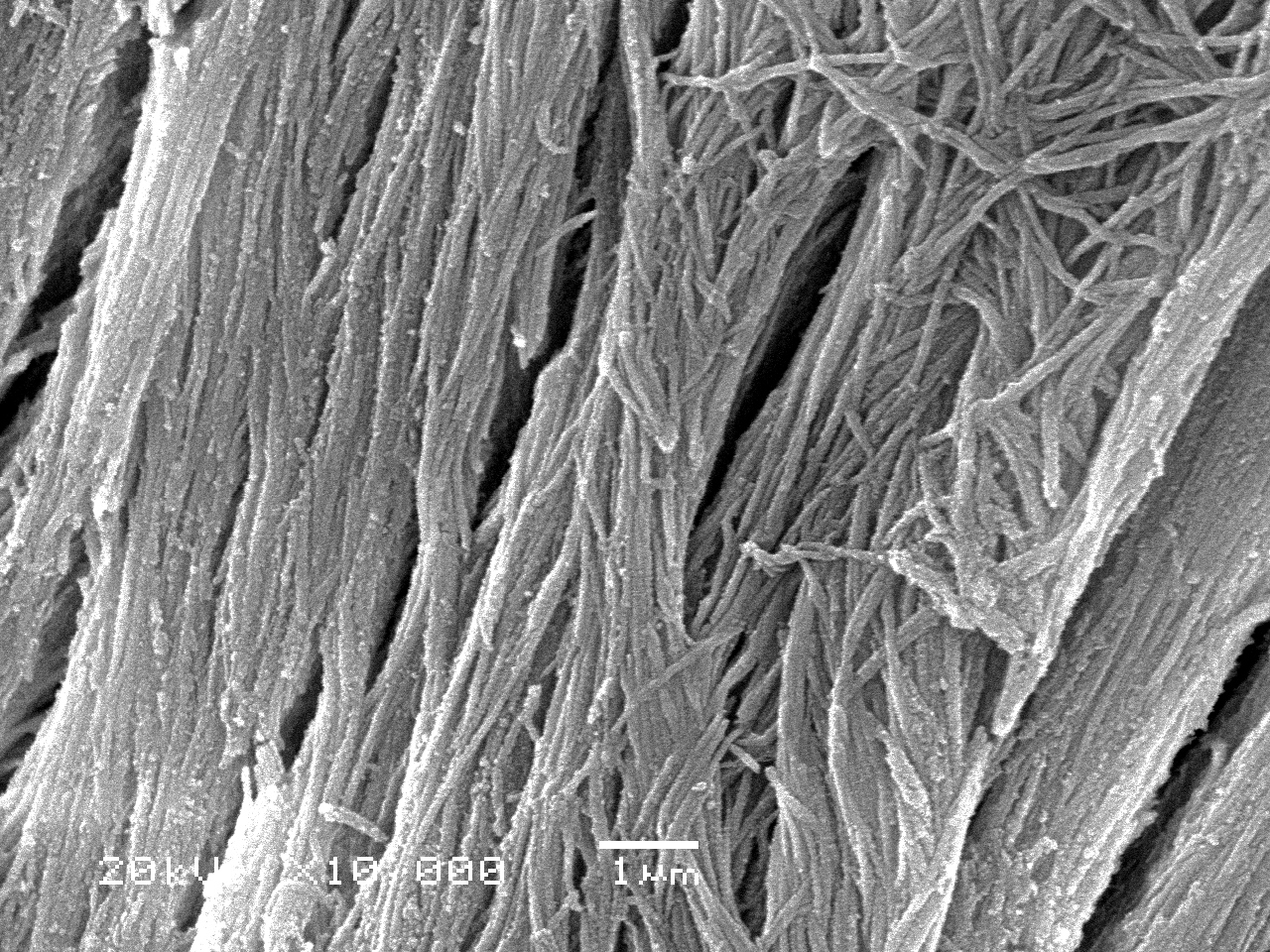
Scanning electron microscopy image of bone mineral

Bone mineral (also called inorganic bone phase, bone salt, or bone apatite) is the inorganic component of bone tissue. It gives bones their compressive strength. The main mineral in bone is calcium phosphate, with smaller amounts of hydrogen phosphate, carbonate, and hydroxide. Together these form carbonated hydroxyapatite with lower crystallinity, the predominant component of bone.

Bone mineral is formed from globular and plate structures distributed among the collagen fibrils of bone and forming yet a larger structure. The bone salt and collagen fibers together constitute the extracellular matrix of bone tissue. Often the plural form "bone salts" is used; it reflects the notion of various salts that, on the level of molecular metabolism, can go into the formation of the hydroxyapatite.

Bone mineral is dynamic in living animals; it is continually being resorbed and built anew in the bone remodeling process. In fact, the bones function as a bank or storehouse in which calcium can be continually withdrawn for use or deposited for storage, as dictated by homeostasis, which maintains the concentration of calcium ions in the blood serum within a particular range despite the variability of muscle tissue metabolism. Parathyroid hormone and calcitonin are the principal hormones with which the neuroendocrine system controls this ongoing process. The parathyroid and thyroid glands in the neck produce those hormones; thus, problems with those glands (such as hypo- or hyperparathyroidism or hypo- or hyperthyroidism) can create problems with bone mineral density (as well as hypo- or hypercalcaemia).

== See also ==
- Ossein, the organic matrix of bone
