= Ossein =

Collagen of bones

Ossein is the organic extracellular matrix of bone, which is made of 95% collagen. This substance is used in industry for the production of gelatin and bone glue.

In the early 20th century, bones were found to consist of three types of proteins: ossein (collagens), osseomucoid (proteoglycans) and osseoalbuminoid (elastin). Advances in molecular biology rendered these terms obsolete.

== Applications ==
When processed industrially, 1,000 kg of bones yield 300 kg of ossein, which can be rapidly degraded and partially denatured by the prolonged action of slightly acidic boiling water, yielding gelatin. The product is specifically known as ossein gelatin in contrast to skin gelatin, which is generated from animal hides. Depending on the method of extraction, there are various types of ossein gelatin (acid ossein gelatin, limed ossein gelatin, etc.).

Another prominent use of ossein is the production of bone glue, whose yield is 16-20% of the mass of dry bone. Bones that are unsuitable for ossein production can be carbonized to generate bone char, used to filter water among other uses.

=== Extraction methods ===
Ossein can be isolated by treating bones with hydrochloric acid, which dissolves the inorganic matrix (calcium phosphate and calcium carbonate). The process was discovered no later than 15th century but only really spread in the 18th century, after Glauber's publications. The resulting liquor carrying calcium chloride and phosphoric acid may then be treated with calcium hydroxide to recover dicalcium phosphate for fertilizers or animal feed supplement.

However, the most popular technique of treating the bone meal is steaming or boiling. This process requires no acid but much more energy and may also produce tricalcium phosphate. As an alternative, the deproteinized bone residue left after the removal of ossein can be used to produce bone ash for the manufacture of bone china.

== See also ==
- Bone mineral
