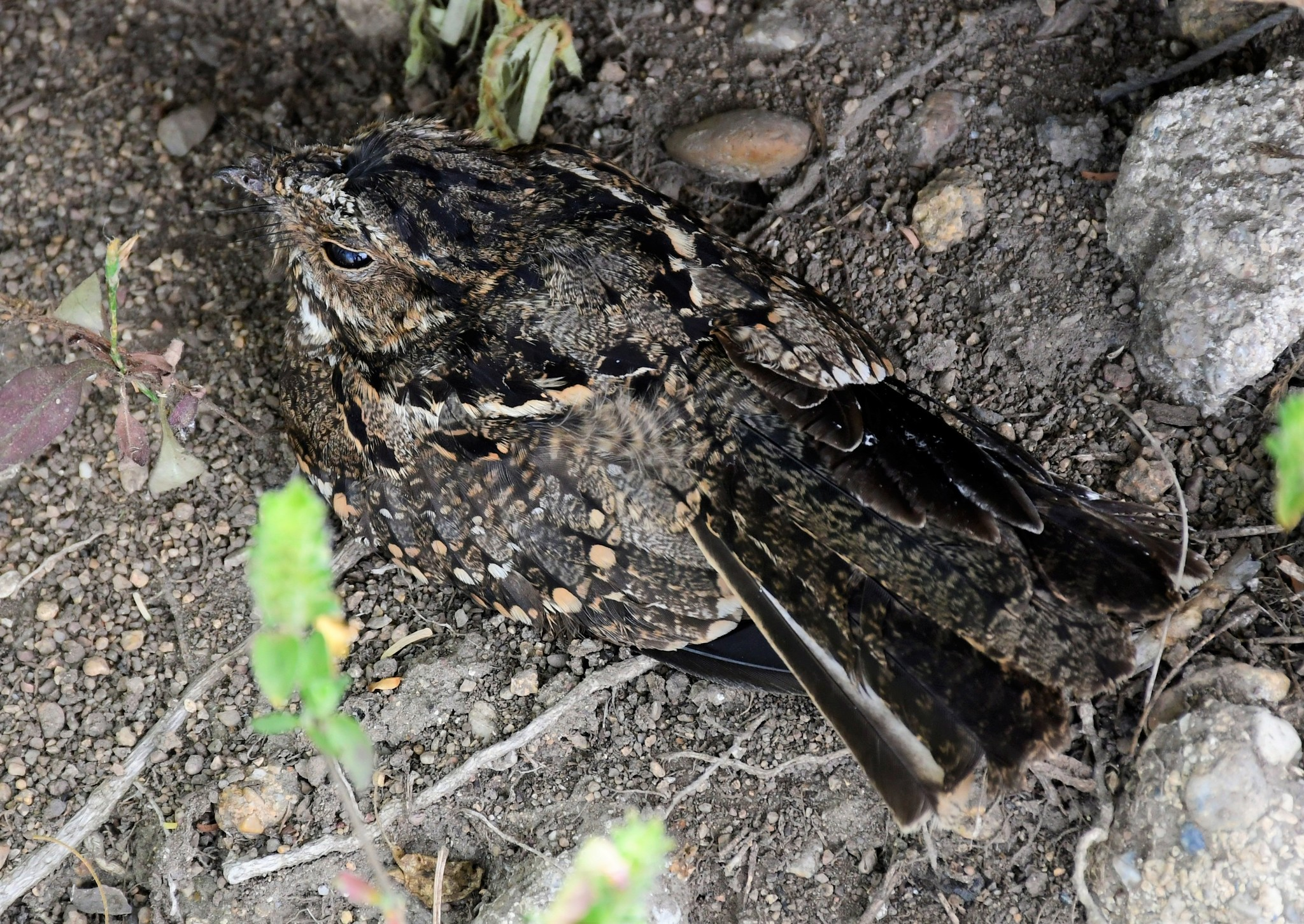

Conservation status
- Least Concern (IUCN 3.1)

Scientific classification
- Kingdom: Animalia
- Phylum: Chordata
- Class: Aves
- Order: Caprimulgiformes
- Family: Caprimulgidae
- Genus: Nyctidromus
- Species: N. anthonyi

Binomial name
- Nyctidromus anthonyi (Chapman, 1923)

Synonyms
- Caprimulgus anthonyi

= Anthony's nightjar =

Species of bird

Anthony's nightjar (Nyctidromus anthonyi), also known as the scrub nightjar, is a species of nightjar in the family Caprimulgidae. It is found in Ecuador and Peru.

== Taxonomy and systematics ==
Anthony's nightjar was originally described in genus Caprimulgus but DNA analysis and vocal differences show that it and its close relative the pauraque (Nyctidromus albicollis) require their own genus. For a time in the mid-1900s it was considered a subspecies of little nightjar (Setopagis parvula). Anthony's nightjar is monotypic.

== Description ==
Male Anthony's nightjars weigh 32.3 to 39.5 g (1.1 to 1.4 oz) with a mean of about 35 g (1.2 oz) and females 31.0 to 42.0 g (1.1 to 1.5 oz) with a mean of about 37 g (1.3 oz). Males have grayish brown upperparts with buff speckles and blackish brown streaks; the crown is darker. They have a broad tawny buff collar on the nape. The tail feathers are mostly brown with considerable white on the outermost pair. The chin and upper throat are tawny buff with dark brown bars and speckles. The lower throat is white, the breast grayish brown with buff bars, and the belly and flanks buff with faint brown bars. In flight the five outermost primary wing feathers show a white or buffy stripe. The female is similar to the male but with less white on the wings and tail.

== Distribution and habitat ==
Anthony's nightjar is found in coastal western Ecuador into northern Peru. It is generally sedentary but may make small movements in response to rains. It inhabits arid open woodlands, grasslands, and shrublands. In elevation it ranges from sea level to 800 m (2,600 ft).

== Behavior ==
Anthony's nightjar is active from dusk to dawn. It roosts on the ground during the day and is usually solitary.

=== Feeding ===
Though Anthony's nightjar is active throughout the night, it does most of its foraging at dusk and in early evening. It captures its insect prey in flight or by sallying from a branch. It tends to forage over open or semi-open areas.

=== Breeding ===
The breeding season of Anthony's nightjar has not been defined, though it appears to be concentrated between December and March and be tied to rainfall. It lays its clutch of one to two eggs on the ground atop leaf litter.

=== Vocalization ===
Anthony's nightjar sings mostly at dusk and dawn. Its simple song is "a short treeow or keeLEEoo" sung from the ground or a low perch. It also makes a "rolling quaqrr" from a perch and "a soft tuk tuk tuk" flight call.

== Status ==
The IUCN has assessed Anthony's nightjar as being of Least Concern. Its population is unknown but believed to be increasing, perhaps in response to the clearing of forest and dense scrub.
