= Clopton Havers =

English physician (1657–1702)

- Born: 24 February 1657; Stambourne, Essex, UK
- Died: April 1702 (aged 45)
- Resting place: Willingale, Essex
- Education: Utrecht University
- Known for: Describing Haversian canals
- Spouse: Dorcas Fuller
- Scientific career
- Fields: Medicine, anatomy
- Thesis: De Respiratione, On Respiration (1685)

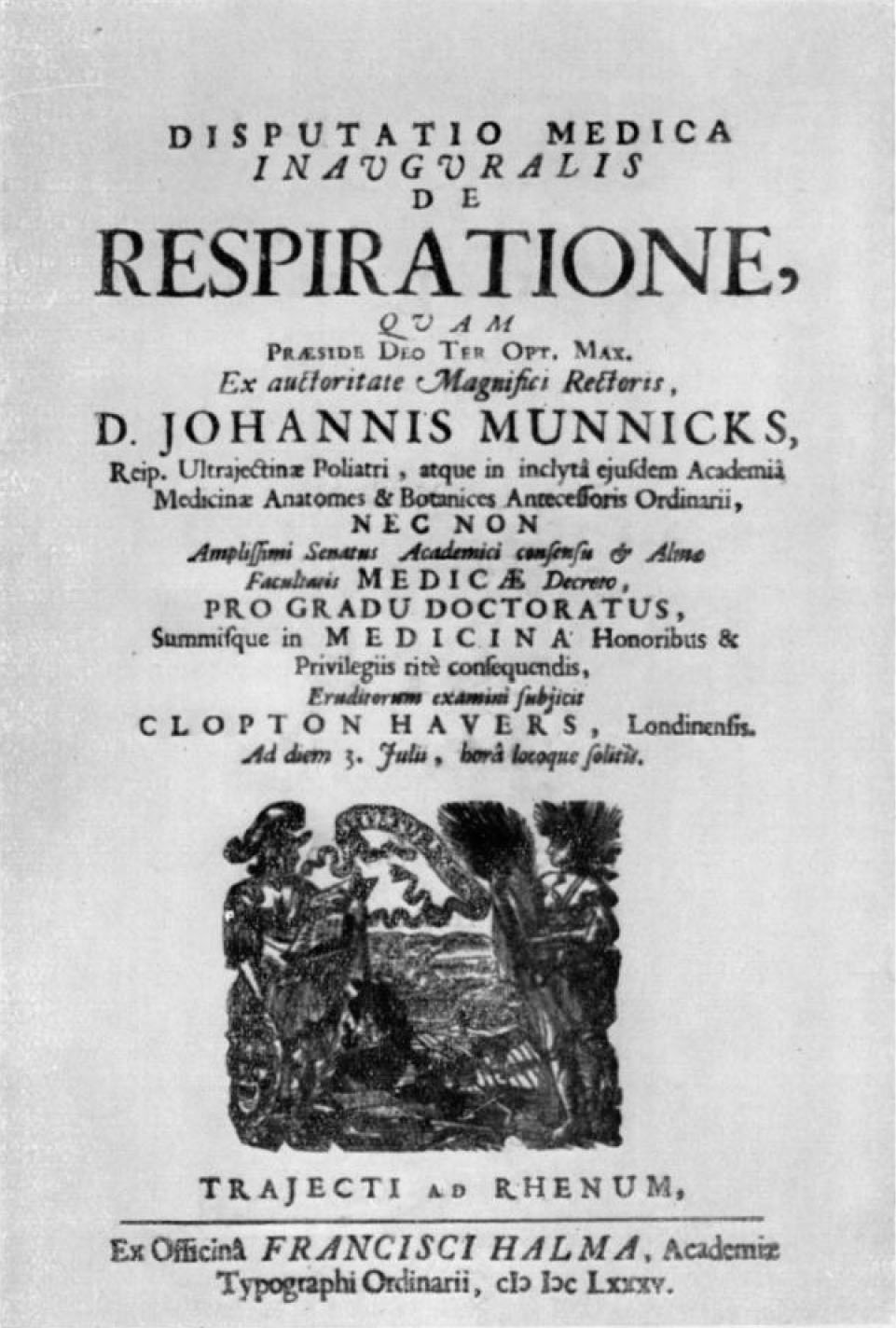
Havers' thesis

Clopton Havers (24 February 1657 – April 1702) was an English physician who did pioneering research on the microstructure of bone. He is believed to have been the first person to observe and almost certainly the first to describe what are now called Haversian canals and Sharpey's fibres.

== Early life ==
Havers was born in Stambourne, Essex, the son of Henry Havers, Rector of Stambourne. He studied medicine under Richard Morton, and later, in 1668, attended St Catharine's College, Cambridge, but failed to graduate. Following this, Havers' whereabouts are unknown until 1684, when he was admitted as an extra-licentiate of the College of Physicians of London, which allowed him to practice medicine in limited areas of the country. In 1685, he studied at Utrecht University in the Netherlands, and was awarded a degree of "Doctor of Medicine" following presentation of his thesis, entitled De Respiratione (On Respiration) in 1685.

== Career ==
Havers practiced medicine in London, and was particularly interested in osteology, the study of bones. He was admitted a Fellow of the Royal Society on 15 December 1686. His most influential work, Osteologia nova, or some new Observations of the Bones, was the first report of the microscopic structure of bone. Notably, he described Haversian canals, which bear his name. He also described Sharpey's fibres. This work was greatly praised by the Italian scientist Giorgio Baglivi, and it was published in several editions in Frankfurt and Amsterdam.

In 1694, he delivered the first Gale anatomy lecture, later combined as the Arris and Gale Lecture.

In February 1700, Havers reported to the Royal Society on a Chinese practice of smallpox inoculation, which involved inhaling dried matter from a smallpox pustule.

== Later life ==
Havers married Dorcas Fuller, daughter of Thomas Fuller, the Rector of Willingale, Essex. Havers died in Willingale in 1702 and was buried at Willingale Doe, Essex. His funeral sermon, dedicated to his widow, was preached by Lilly Butler, minister of St Mary Aldermanbury, and was later printed in quarto.

== Works ==
- Osteologia nova, or some new Observations of the Bones, and the Parts belonging to them, with the manner of their Accretion and Nutrition. 1691.
