= Microdamage in bone =

Medical condition of the bones

Microdamage in bone can be caused by the various loads to which bones are subjected during normal daily activity. It occurs in two different types mainly depending on the load: diffuse damage and microcracks.
