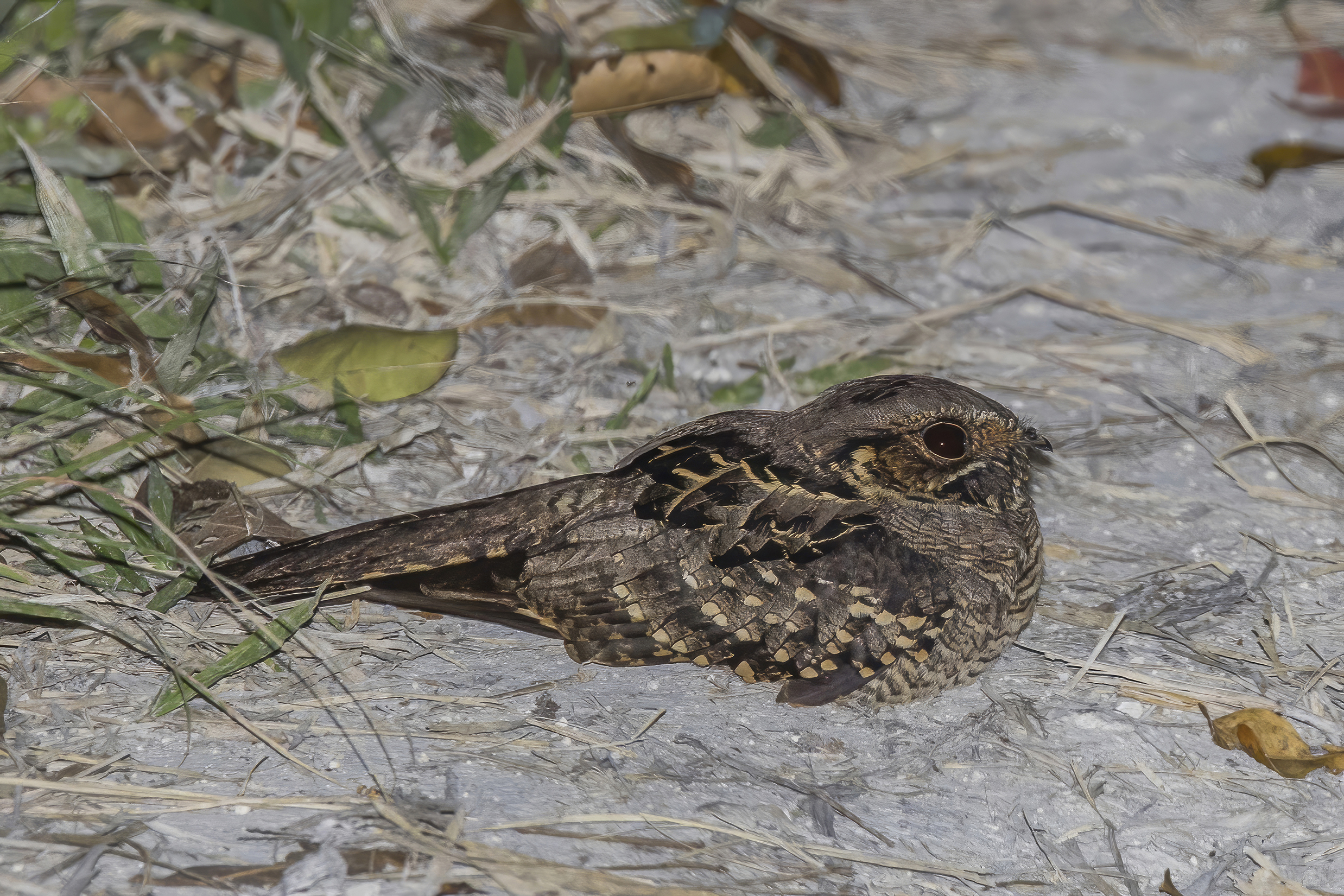
- N. a. yucatanensis in Belize Common Pauraque song, recorded in Peru

Conservation status
- Least Concern (IUCN 3.1)

Scientific classification
- Kingdom: Animalia
- Phylum: Chordata
- Class: Aves
- Clade: Strisores
- Order: Caprimulgiformes
- Family: Caprimulgidae
- Genus: Nyctidromus
- Species: N. albicollis

Binomial name
- Nyctidromus albicollis (Gmelin, JF, 1789)

= Pauraque =

Species of bird

The pauraque (Nyctidromus albicollis) – also called the common pauraque to distinguish it from similar species – is a nightjar species, one of two birds in the genus Nyctidromus. It breeds in the subtropical and tropical regions of the New World, and except for northernmost birds it is largely resident all year round.

== Taxonomy ==
The pauraque was formally described in 1789 by the German naturalist Johann Friedrich Gmelin in his revised and expanded edition of Carl Linnaeus's Systema Naturae. He placed it with all the other nightjars in the genus Caprimulgus and coined the binomial name Caprimulgus albicollis. Gmelin based his description on the "white-throated goatsucker" that had been described in 1783 by the English ornithologist John Latham in his A General Synopsis of Birds. Latham had examined a preserved specimen in London that was thought to have come from Cayenne, French Guiana. The pauraque is now placed with Anthony's nightjar in the genus Nyctidromus that was introduced in 1838 by the English ornithologist John Gould. The genus name combines the Ancient Greek nukti- meaning "nocturnal" or "night-" with -dromos meaning "-racer". The specific epithet albicollis combines the Latin albus meaning "white" with the Modern Latin "-collis" meaning "-necked".

The common name "pauraque" may be an onomatopoeia from the bird's wailing call.

Six subspecies are recognised:

- N. a. insularis Nelson, 1898 – Tres Marías Is. (off w Mexico)
- N. a. merrilli Sennett, 1888 – south Texas (USA) and northeast Mexico
- N. a. yucatanensis Nelson, 1901 – west, east Mexico (including Yucatán Peninsula) to central Guatemala
- N. a. gilvus Bangs, 1902 – central, east Panama and north Colombia
- N. a. albicollis (Gmelin, JF, 1789) – south Guatemala to northwest Peru; east Colombia, northwest Peru and Venezuela through the Guianas and Brazil
- N. a. derbyanus Gould, 1838 – Bolivia, central, south Brazil, Paraguay and northeast Argentina

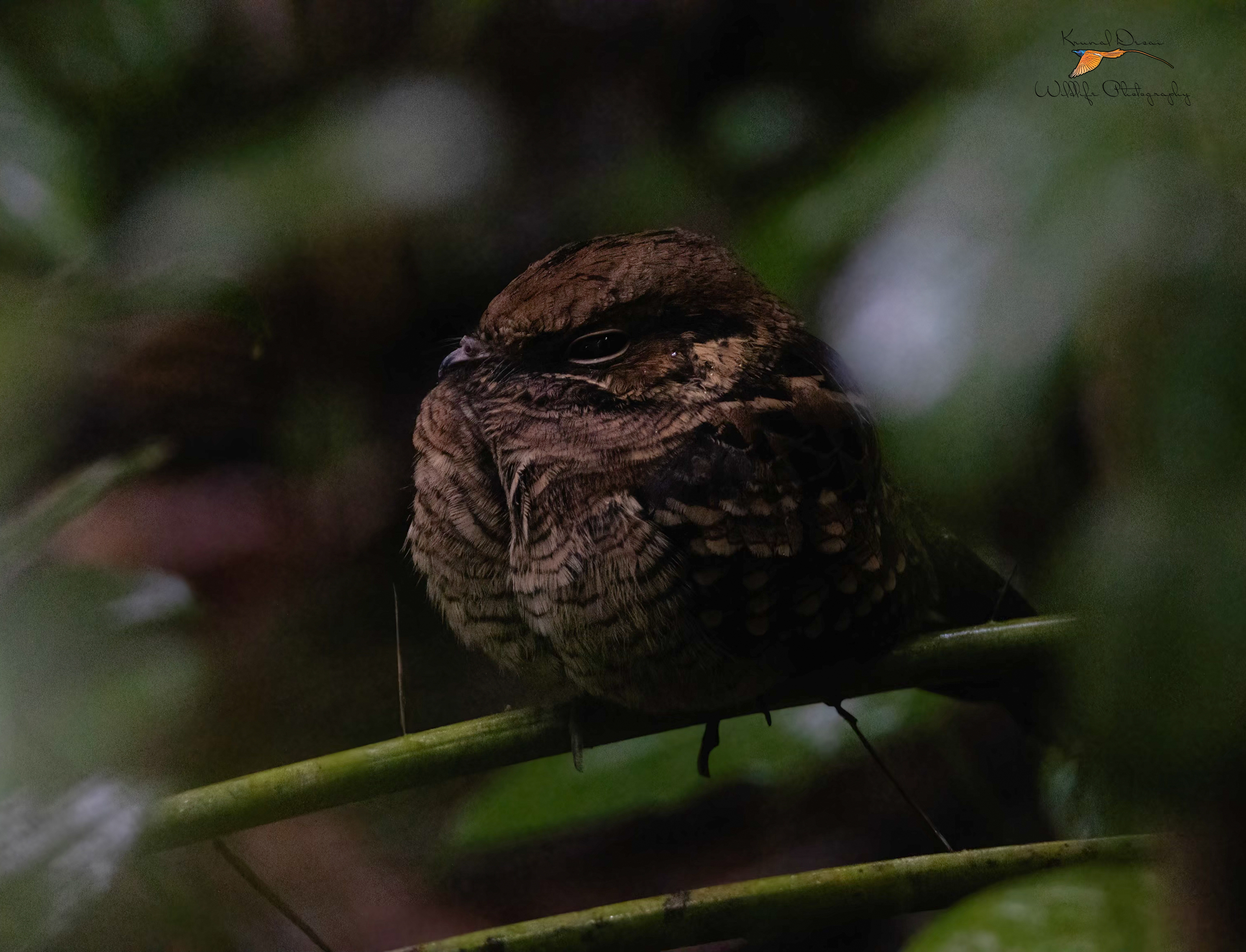
Common pauraque roosting in Manuel Antonio National Park.

== Description ==
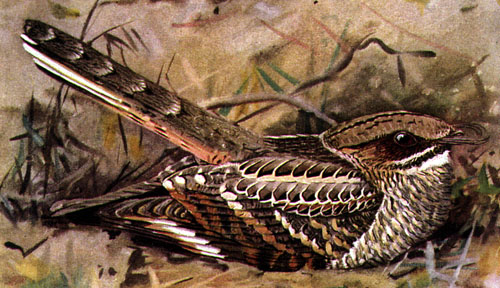
Nyctidromus albicollis Louis Agassiz Fuertes, 1926

This medium-sized nightjar is 8.7–11 in (22–28 cm) long and has two colour morphs, the plumage being variegated greyish-brown or rufous-brown. It is long-tailed and has broad rounded wings. The buff 'eye-ring' and 'facial stripe' contrast with the reddish sides of the face.

The adult male pauraque has a white band near the wing tips, and the outer tail feathers are mainly white. The female's wing band is narrower and the white in the outer tail is more restricted. There are seven subspecies of the pauraque, differing in size and greyness.

The male pauraque's song is very variable, but includes a whistled weeeow wheeooo ("who-r-you"), soft puk puk and a whip given in the courtship flight as he flutters around the female. Her call is a rapid succession of whip sounds.

== Distribution and ecology ==
The breeding range of the common pauraque extends from southern Texas to the lower Paraná River region. Most populations are all-year residents, although the U.S. breeders (N. a. merrilli) may winter in eastern Mexico.

At the southern end of its range, subspecies N. a. derbyanus ranges from central and southern Brazil into the adjacent parts of Bolivia, and through Paraguay into Argentina and Uruguay. Even the southernmost birds seem to be nonmigratory, but at the limit of its range the species is only patchily distributed. For example, it is not recorded to breed in Entre Ríos Province (Argentina) and it is scarce in Rio Grande do Sul (Brazil); about its presence in Uruguay likewise little is known, except that a population of some size is found along the Yaguarón River in the Cuchilla de Mangrullo region.

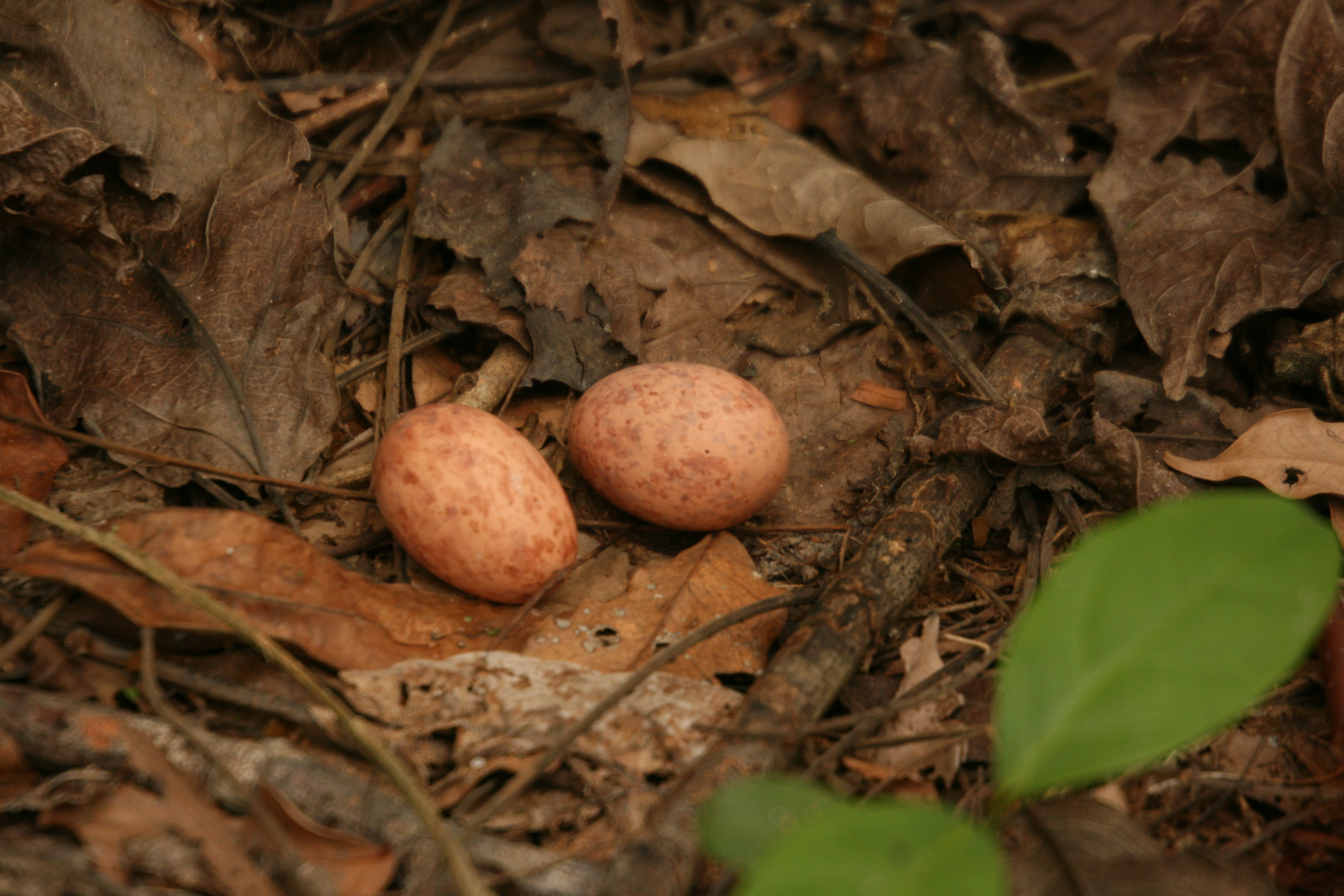
The two pinkish eggs of the pauraque are laid directly on the ground or leaf litter.

It is found in open woodland/grassland habitats, but also scrubland and crop fields. This species has long legs (by nightjar standards) with bare tarsi, and is more terrestrial than most of its relatives. If disturbed, it will sometimes run rather than fly, and it frequently rests on roads and tracks. In general, it prefers mixed habitat which offers densely vegetated hiding places – ideally forest – for the day, as well as open landscape – perhaps even rivers or wetlands – to hunt at night. The pauraque is nocturnal, like other nightjars, and starts to fly at dusk. Like its relatives, it feeds on insects caught in flight, usually by flycatching from a low perch, but also by foraging over open ground.

No nest is made; the two elongated and elliptical pinkish eggs are placed upon the bare ground or leaf litter. Sometimes just one egg is laid. Not globally threatened, it is considered a Species of Least Concern by the IUCN. Being an adaptable species that will tolerate human disturbance of habitat well, the pauraque has actually benefitted from limited deforestation. Logging creates areas of low and secondary growth in which the birds are able to hunt more efficiently. However, it will of course abandon heavily built-up or clear-cut locales, and, in addition, it is very vulnerable to predation by feral dogs and cats, disappearing from areas where these pests are abundant.
