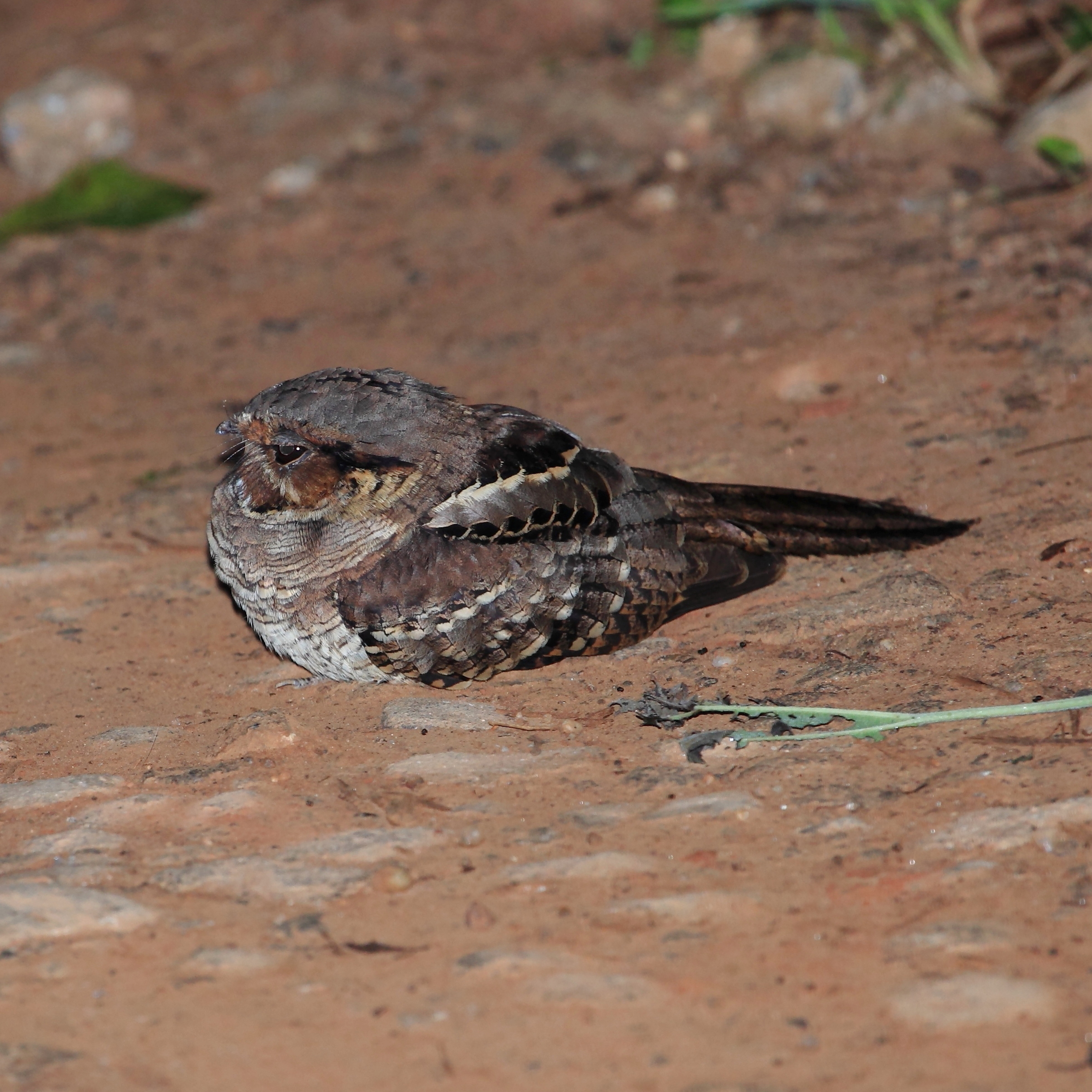
- Pauraque (Nyctidromus albicollis)

Scientific classification
- Kingdom: Animalia
- Phylum: Chordata
- Class: Aves
- Order: Caprimulgiformes
- Family: Caprimulgidae
- Genus: Nyctidromus; Gould, 1838

Type species
- Nyctidromus derbyanus (pauraque) Gould, 1838

= Nyctidromus =

Genus of birds

Nyctidromus is a genus of nightjars in the family Caprimulgidae. The species are widely distributed in Central and South America.

== Taxonomy ==
The genus Nyctidromus was introduced in 1838 by the English ornithologist John Gould to accommodate his newly described Nyctidromus derbyanus. This taxon is therefore the type species; it is now considered a subspecies of the pauraque, Nyctidromus albicollis (Gmelin) 1789. The genus name combines the Ancient Greek nukti- meaning "nocturnal" or "night-" with -dromos meaning "-racer" (from trekhō "to run").

The genus contains two species:

- Pauraque, Nyctidromus albicollis
- Anthony's nightjar, Nyctidromus anthonyi
