= Hydrogen phosphate =

Hydrogen phosphate may refer to

- Monohydrogen phosphate, inorganic ion with the formula [HPO_{4}]^{2−}
- Dihydrogen phosphate, inorganic ion with the formula [H_{2}PO_{4}]^{−}
  - Potassium hydrogen phosphate
  - Sodium hydrogen phosphate

== See also ==
- Phosphate
