= Lacuna (histology) =

Small space between lamellae containing osteocytes

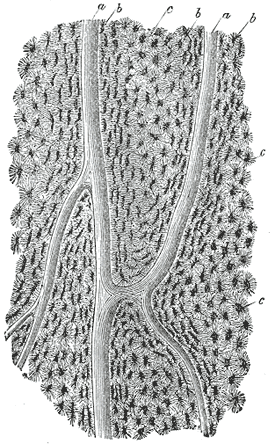
- Section parallel to the surface from the body of the femur. X 100. a, Haversian canals; b, lacunae seen from the side; c, others seen from the surface in lamella, which are cut horizontally.

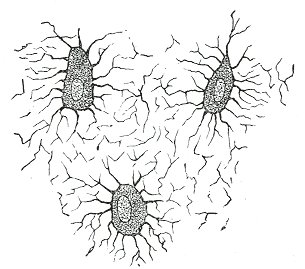
- Nucleated bone cells and their processes, contained in the bone lacunae and their canaliculi respectively. From a section through the vertebra of an adult mouse.

In histology, a lacuna is a small space, containing an osteocyte in bone, or chondrocyte in cartilage.

== Bone ==
The lacuna are situated between the lamellae, and consist of a number of oblong spaces. In an ordinary microscopic section, viewed by transmitted light, they appear as fusiform opaque spots. Each lacuna is occupied during life by a branched cell, termed an osteocyte, bone-cell or bone-corpuscle. Lacunae are connected to one another by small canals called canaliculi. A lacuna never contains more than one osteocyte. Sinuses are an example of lacuna.

The system of tiny microchannels extending outwards from each bone lacuna is called canaliculi, these channels interconnect neighboring lacunae to facilitate nutrient transport and intercellular communication between osteocytes.

== Cartilage ==
The cartilage cells or chondrocytes are contained in cavities in the matrix, called cartilage lacunae; around these, the matrix is arranged in concentric lines as if it had been formed in successive portions around the cartilage cells. This constitutes the so-called capsule of the space. Each lacuna is generally occupied by a single cell, but during the division of the cells, it may contain two, four, or eight cells. Lacunae are found between narrow sheets of calcified matrix that are known as lamellae (/ləˈmɛli/ lə-MEL-ee).

Lacunae have many spatial properties that dictate localized mechanical strain and interstitial fluid shear stress surrounding resident cells.

== Clinical Significance ==
The alterations in lacunar density, size, and structural integrity are directly associated with metabolic skeletal diseases, including osteoporosis and age-related bone fragility.

== See also ==
- Lacunar stroke
