= Bioactive glass S53P4 =

Biomaterial

Bioactive glass S53P4 (BAG-S53P4) is a biomaterial consisting of sodium, silicate, calcium and phosphate. S53P4 is osteoconductive and also osteoproductive in the promotion, migration, replication and differentiation of osteogenic cells and their matrix production. In other words, it facilitates bone formation and regeneration (osteostimulation). S53P4 has been proven to naturally inhibit the bacterial growth of up to 50 clinically relevant bacteria strains.

== History ==
The S53P4 bioactive glass has its roots in the bioglass 45S5 developed by Larry Hench in the late 1960s in New York. A couple of decades later, in the 1980s, the compound S53P4 bioactive glass was developed in Turku, Finland. S53P4 was found to be osteostimulative (non-osteoinductive), but it also had one new additional property: the composition of 53% silica and smaller weights of sodium, calcium and phosphorus gave rise to surface reactions in vitro that appeared to inhibit bacterial growth – a material that could not be infected by bacteria was discovered.

== Applications ==
Areas of use include a wide range of indications that require the filling of bone cavities, voids, and gaps as well as the reconstruction or regeneration of bone defects. Several long-term studies have shown that mastoid cavities in both cholesteatoma, old radical cavities, and chronic otitis media can be successfully obliterated with S53P4 bioactive glass.

Clinical application has been gained from several extensive studies where patients with bone infections have been treated. S53P4 has shown promising results in chronic osteomyelitis surgery, septic non-union surgery, segmental defect reconstructions and other infectious complications, such as sternum infections, diabetic foot osteomyelitis and spine infections.

S53P4 has gained clinical experience within spine surgery in spine fusions and spinal deformity surgery.

S53P4 has also been used successfully in the filling of benign bone tumor cavities in both adults and children, sustaining the bone cavity volume long term. Clinical experience has been gained from aneurysmal bone cysts (ABC), simple bone cysts (UBC), enchondroma and nonossifying fibroma (NOF).

== Mechanism of action ==
When S53P4 bioactive glass is implanted into a bone cavity, the glass is activated through a reaction with body fluids. During this activation period, the bioactive glass goes through a series of chemical reactions, creating the ideal conditions for bone to rebuild through osteoconduction.

- Na, Si, Ca, and P ions are released.
- A silica gel layer forms on the bioactive glass surface.
- CaP crystallizes, forming a layer of hydroxyapatite on the surface of the bioactive glass.

Once the hydroxyapatite layer is formed, the bioactive glass interacts with biological entities, i.e. blood proteins, growth factors and collagen. Following this interactive, osteoconductive and osteostimulative process, new bone grows onto and between the bioactive glass structures.

- Bioactive glass bonds to bone – facilitating new bone formation.
- Osteostimulation begins by stimulating osteogenic cells to increase the remodeling rate of bone.
- Radio-dense quality of bioactive glass allows for post-operative evaluation.

In the final transformative phase, the process of bone regeneration and remodeling continues. Over time, the glass is fully remodeled into bone, restoring the patient's natural anatomy.

- Bone consolidation occurs.
- S53P4 bioactive glass continues to remodel into bone over a period of years.

== Inhibition of bacterial growth ==
The bacterial growth inhibiting properties of S53P4 derive from two simultaneous chemical and physical processes, occurring once the bioactive glass reacts with body fluids. Sodium (Na) is released from the surface of the bioactive glass and induces an increase in pH (alkaline environment), which is not favorable for the bacteria, thus inhibiting their growth. The released Na, Ca, Si and P ions give rise to an increase in osmotic pressure due to an elevation in salt concentration, i.e. an environment where bacteria cannot grow.
