= Artificial bone =

Bone-like material

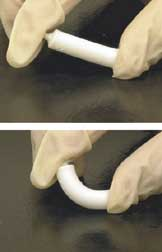
Flexible hydrogel-HA composite, which has a mineral-to-organic matrix ratio approximating that of human bone

Artificial bone refers to bone-like material created in a laboratory that can be used in bone grafts, to replace human bone that was lost due to severe fractures, disease, etc.

Bone fracture, which is a complete or partial break in the bone, is a very common condition that has more than three million US cases per year. Human bones have the ability to regenerate themselves through the cycle of bone resorption and bone formation. The cell responsible for bone resorption is osteoclast, while the cell responsible for bone formation is osteoblast. However, if damage to bone is caused by a disease or severe injury, it becomes difficult for the body to repair itself. When the human body is unable to regenerate the lost bone tissue, surgeons replace the missing bone using autografts, allografts, and synthetic grafts (artificial bone). When comparing artificial bone to autograft and allograft, it is less invasive and more biocompatible since it avoids the risk of unknown viral infections.

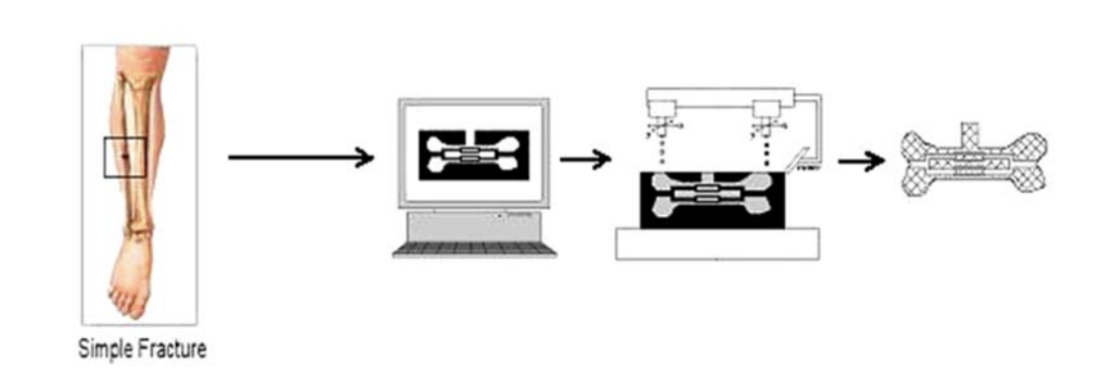
The use of solid freeform fabrication in design of composite scaffolds

When designing implanted biomaterials, key criteria are biocompatibility, osteoconductivity, high porosity and biomechanics compatibility. Artificial bone was initially made of materials like metals and solid ceramics, which are strong enough to sustain the loading in bone. However, the rigidity of those materials created an enormous burden on patients and was not consistent with the criteria for implanting biomaterials. Artificial bones made of metal and ceramic tend to do poorly in terms of biocompatibility since it is difficult to blend into bone tissues.

The two major components of bone are hydroxyapatite (Ca_{10}(PO_{4})_{6}(OH)_{2}), and collagen fibers. Hydroxyapatite, which is one of the most stable forms of calcium phosphate, makes up about 60 to 65 percent of the bone. The rest of the bone is composed of materials including chondroitin sulfate, keratan sulfate and lipid. Increased research and knowledge regarding the organization, structure of properties of collagen and hydroxyapatite have led to many developments in collagen-based scaffolds in bone tissue engineering. The structure of hydroxyapatite is very similar to that of the original bone, and collagen can act as molecular cables and further improve the biocompatibility of the implant.

== Overview ==
=== Demographics of bone injury ===
In the United States, more than 6.5 million bone defects and more than 3 million facial injury cases have been reported each year. More than 2.2 million bone graft procedures are performed worldwide per year. The common causes for bone graft are tumor resection, congenital malformation, trauma, fractures, surgery, osteoporosis, and arthritis. According to the National Ambulatory Medical Care Survey (NAMCS), in 2010, there were approximately 63 million visits to the orthopedic surgery department and about 3.5 million visits for fractures in the emergency departments in the U.S. Among the 6.5 million bone fracture or defect cases, approximately 887,679 people were hospitalized.

Structure of chitin

=== Current areas of bone grafting (types of bones, composites) ===
Research on material types in bone grafting has been traditionally centered on producing composites of organic polysaccharides (chitin, chitosan, alginate) and minerals (hydroxyapatite). Alginate scaffolds, composed of cross-linked calcium ions, are actively being explored in the regeneration of skin, liver, and bone. Alginate's ability to scaffold and makes it a novel polysaccharide. Even though many minerals can be adapted for bone composition, hydroxyapatite remains the dominant material, as its strength and the known Jager-Fratzl model of human bone provide a preexisting framework for spacing and fabrication.

=== Material types ===
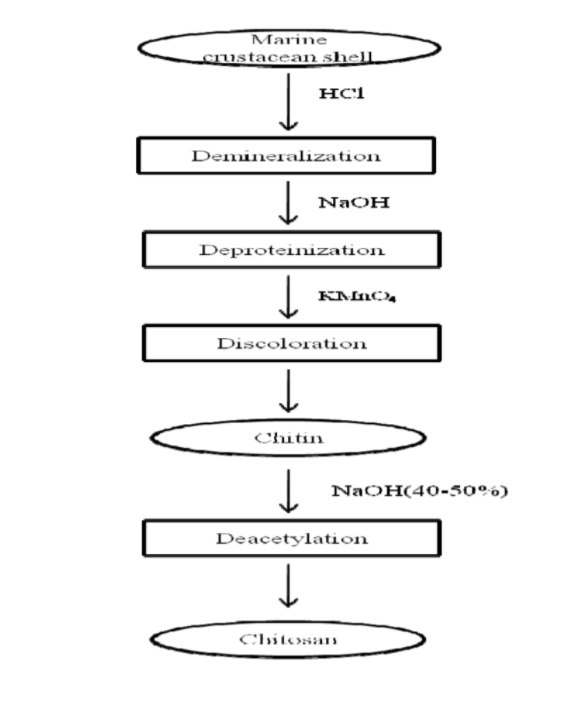
Preparation of chitin and chitosan from marine crustaceans

Materials suited for use in artificial bones need to be biocompatible, osteoconductive, and mechanically strong. Hydroxyapatite is often used in artificial bone studies because it has the biocompatibility and osteoconductivity required for an effective, long-lasting bone implant, but is quite brittle, and further exhibits a dissolution rate of about 10 wt% per year, which is significantly slower than the growth rate of newly formed bone, necessitating measures to enhance its dissolution rate. For applications that require a material with better toughness, nanostructured artificial nacre may be used due to its high tensile strength and Young's modulus. In many cases, using one type of material limits the capabilities of an artificial bone implant, so composites are utilized. Implants composed of chitosan and hydroxyapatite take advantage of chitosan's biocompatibility and its ability to be molded into complex porous shapes as well as hydroxyapatite's osteoconductivity to create a composite that features all three traits. Other composites suitable for use in artificial bone are those using alginate, a biopolymer known for its scaffold-forming properties. Uses for alginate in composites include chitosan composites for bone tissue repair, bioglass composites for repairing or replacing defective or diseased bone, or ceramic-collagen composites for bone regeneration. The material used in an artificial bone implant ultimately depends on the type of implant being created and its use.

=== 3D printing of artificial bones ===
3D printing is becoming an efficient way to produce artificial bones. First, a bone model is created theough reconstruction from CAT scan images of the patient. Then the artificial bone materials are used as "filament" for 3D printing. The printer prints the artificial bone layer by layer. Recent studies show hydroxyapatite (HA) nanocrystals are ideal material for 3D printed artificial bones. HA nanocrystals are synthesized by wet synthesis using diammonium phosphate and calcium chloride as phosphorus and calcium precursors, respectively. Furthermore, polycaprolactone (PCL) can also be used for 3D printing producing of artificial bone in some research reports. Compared to repairing damaged bones, 3D printing technique could produce implants which meets personalized repair needs. On the other hand, 3D printing techniques produce implants with few adverse effects on patients. Host cells of varying classifications, such as lymphocytes and erythrocytes, display minimal immunological response to artificial grafts.

== Advantages ==
=== Material properties ===
Effective bone substitute materials should exhibit good mechanical strength along with adequate bioactivity. Bioactivity, which is often gauged in terms of dissolution rates and the formation of a mineral layer on the implant surface in-vivo, can be enhanced in biomaterials, in particular hydroxyapatite, by modifying the composition and structure by doping. As an alternative to hydroxyaptatite systems, chitosan composites have been thoroughly studied as one material to use for artificial bone. Chitosan by itself can be easily modified into complex shapes that include porous structures, making it suitable for cell growth and osteoconduction. In addition, chitosan scaffolds are biocompatible and biodegradable, but have low toughness, and the material itself is not osteoconductive. Hydroxyapatite, on the other hand, features excellent biocompatibility but is hindered by its brittle nature. When implemented with hydroxyapatite as a composite, both the toughness and osteoconductivity significantly improve, making the composite a viable option for material for artificial bone. Chitosan can also be used with carbon nanotubes, which have a high Young's modulus (1.0–1.8 TPa), tensile strength (30–200 GPa), elongation at break (10–30%), and aspect ratio (>1,000). Carbon nanotubes are very small in size, chemically and structurally stable, and bioactive. The composite formed by carbon nanotubes and chitosan greatly improves the toughness of chitosan. Nanostructured artificial nacre is another option for creating artificial bone. Natural nacre is composed of an arrangement of organic and inorganic layers similar to brick and mortar. This along with the ionic crosslinking of tightly folded molecules allow nacre to have high strength and toughness. Artificial nacre that mimicked both the structure and the effect of the ionic bonds had a tensile strength similar to natural nacre as well as an ultimate Young's modulus similar to lamellar bone. From a mechanical standpoint, this material would be a viable option for artificial bone.

== Design consideration ==
=== Clinical results ===
Several aspects of any artificial bone design must be considered before implementing the design into a patient. Artificial bone implants that are an ill fit inside a patient due to events such as leaving the recipient bone unfixed can cause redness and swelling at the recipient region. Ill-fitted implants may also be caused by sintering, which can cause dimensional contraction of an implant by up to 27%. Osteoconductivity is another important consideration for artificial bone design. Sintered materials increase the crystallinity of calcium phosphate in certain artificial bones, which leads to poor resorption by osteoclasts and compromised biodegradability. One study avoided this by creating inkjet-printed, custom-made artificial bones that utilized α-tricalcium phosphate (TCP), a material that converts to hydroxyapatite and solidifies the implant without the use of sintering. In addition, α-TCP is biocompatible and helps form new bone, which is better for patients in the long term. Artificial bone designs must be biocompatible, have osteoconductivity, and last for long periods of time inside a patient in order to be a viable solution compared to autologous and allogeneic bone implants.

== Challenges ==
=== Surface properties ===
Artificial grafts maintain comparable compressive strength, but occasionally lack similarity to human bone in response to lateral or frictional forces. In particular, the topography of artificial bone is inaccurate compared to its natural counterpart. In Grant et al., artificial bone grafts produced by fused deposition had on average a 20% lower coefficient of friction compared to real bone. While CT scans and subsequent bone models are highly indicative of real bone for internal composition, the final product relies on the resolution of the printer. In cases where printer defects occur, the most likely issue is a decrease in compressive strength due to unintentional voids. After implantation, decreased cellular proliferation and differentiation is evident as patients increase with age. This prolongs the integration of grafts and hinders the formation of bone tissue. In animal models, the incorporation of allografts causes teratoma formation. Whether or not the probability of this event is significantly increased remains to be seen. Thus, scaffolding with other biological agents is necessary to mimic the framework of the body. Type I collagen, which constitutes a significant portion of the organic mass of bone, is a frequently used scaffolding agent. Alternatively, the polymer chitosan possesses similar biological response, namely the promotion of osteogenesis in vivo.

=== Fabrication limitations ===
More modern fabrication techniques include inkjet printing. In one study, a 3D inkjet printer produced autograft implants for the lower jaw of 10 patients. The hydroxyapatite implant was produced from tricalcium phosphate powder which hardened after hydration. The surgical procedure was conducted for both aesthetic and function. All patients indicated satisfaction with the bone product. In another study, which examined replicate goat femurs, hydroxyapatite nanocrystals were produced and mixed on-site before loading a 3D printer. The study noted a slight decrease in compressive strength of the femurs, which could be attributed to imperfect printing and an increased ratio of cancellous bone. In general, 3D printing techniques produce implants with few adverse effects in patients. Host cells of varying classifications, such as lymphocytes and erythrocytes, displayed minimal immunological response to artificial grafts. Only in the case of improper sterilization or previous predisposition to infection did any significant complications occur. The speed of printing is the primary rate-limiting step in artificial bone production. Depending on the type of bone implant, printing time can range from an hour to several. As printers produce higher resolution grafts, the duration of printing increases proportionally.

=== Biological response ===
Research on artificial bone materials has revealed that bioactive and resorbable silicate glasses (bioglass), glass-ceramics, and calcium phosphates exhibit mechanical properties that are similar to human bone. Similar mechanical properties do not assure biocompatibility. The body's biological response to those materials depends on many parameters including chemical composition, topography, porosity, and grain size. If the material is metal, there is a risk of corrosion and infection. If the material is ceramic, it is difficult to form the desired shape, and bone can't reabsorb or replace it due to its high crystallinity. Hydroxyapatite, on the other hand, has shown excellent properties in supporting the adhesion, differentiation, and proliferation of osteogenesis cell since it is both thermodynamically stable and bioactive. Artificial bones using hydroxyapatite combine with collagen tissue helps to form new bones in pores, and have a strong affinity to biological tissues while maintaining uniformity with adjacent bone tissue. Despite its excellent performance in interacting with bone tissue, hydroxyapatite has the same problem as ceramic in reabsorption due to its high crystallinity. Since hydroxyapatite is processed at a high temperature, it is unlikely that it will remain in a stable state.
