= Bioactive glass =

Surface reactive glass-ceramic biomaterial

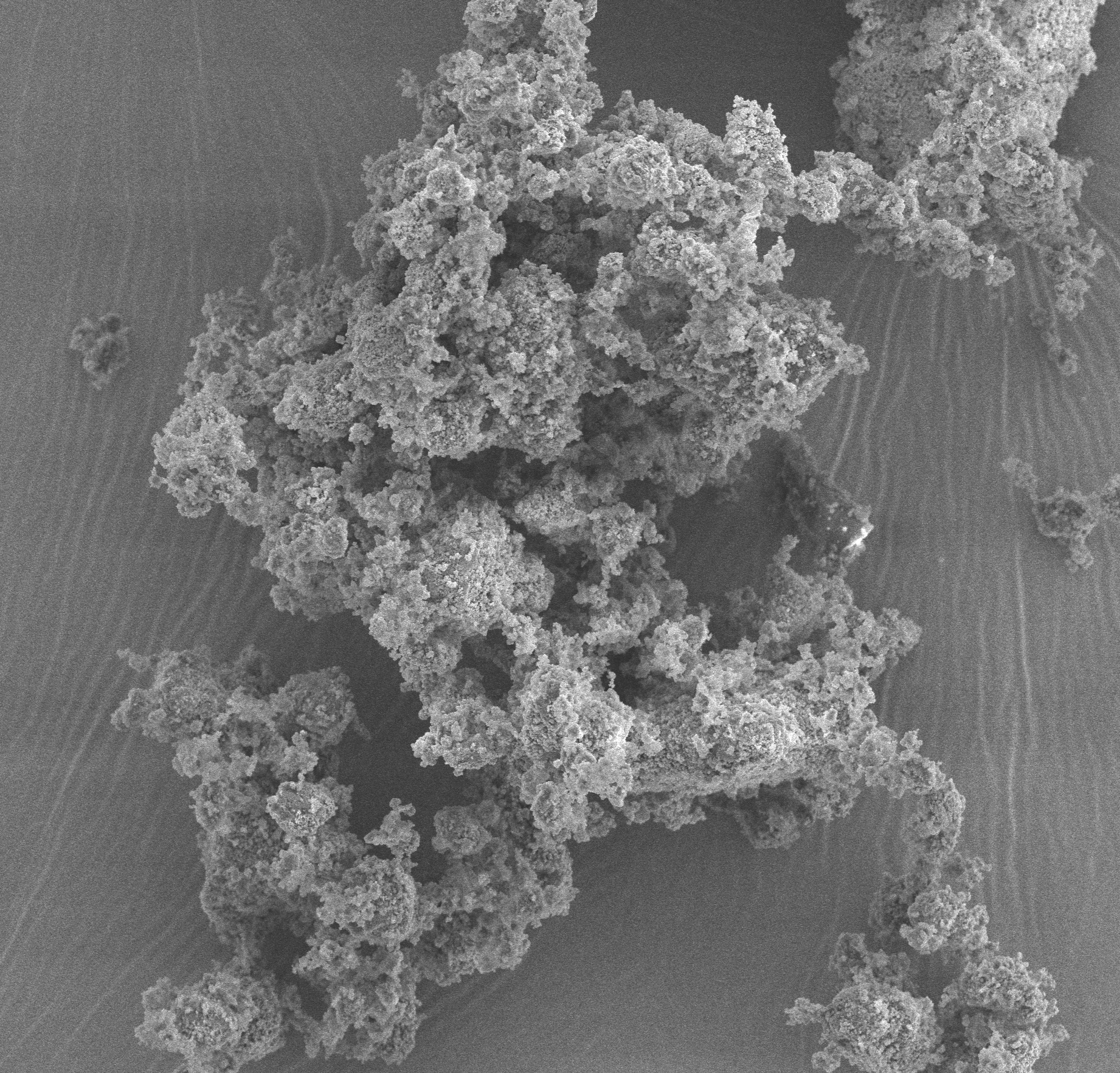
Bioactive glass as seen through an electron microscope

Bioactive glasses are a group of surface reactive glass-ceramic biomaterials and include the original bioactive glass, Bioglass. The biocompatibility and bioactivity of these glasses has led them to be used as implant devices in the human body to repair and replace diseased or damaged bones. Most bioactive glasses are silicate-based glasses that are degradable in body fluids and can act as a vehicle for delivering ions beneficial for healing. Bioactive glass is differentiated from other synthetic bone grafting biomaterials (e.g., hydroxyapatite, biphasic calcium phosphate, calcium sulfate), in that it is the only one with anti-infective and angiogenic properties.

== History ==
=== Discovery and development ===
Larry Hench and colleagues at the University of Florida first developed these materials in 1969 and they have been further developed by his research team at the Imperial College London and other researchers worldwide. Hench began development by submitting a proposal hypothesis to the United States Army Medial Research and Development command in 1968 based upon his theory of the body rejecting metallic or polymeric material unless it was able to form a coating of hydroxyapatite which is found in bone. Hench and his team received funding for one year, and began development on what would become the 45S5 composition. The name "Bioglass" was trademarked by the University of Florida as a name for the original 45S5 composition. It should therefore only be used in reference to the 45S5 composition and not as a general term for bioactive glasses.

Through use of a $\ce{Na2O-CaO-SiO2}$ phase diagram, Hench chose a composition of 45% $\ce{SiO2}$, 24.5% $\ce{Na2O}$, 24.5% $\ce{CaO}$, and 6% $\ce{P2O5}$ to allow for a large amount of $\ce{CaO}$ and some $\ce{P2O5}$ in a $\ce{SiO2-Na2O}$ matrix. The glass was batched, melted, and cast into small rectangular implants to be inserted into the femoral bone of rats for six weeks as developed by Dr. Ted Greenlee of the University of Florida. After six weeks, Dr. Greenlee reported "These ceramic implants will not come out of the bone. They are bonded in place. I can push on them, I can shove them, I can hit them and they do not move. The controls easily slide out." These findings were the basis of the first paper on 45S5 bioactive glass in 1971 which summarized that in vitro experiments in a calcium and phosphate ion deficient solution showed a developed layer of hydroxyapatite similar to the observed hydroxyapatite later in vivo by Dr. Greenlee.

=== Animal Testing ===
Scientists in Amsterdam, the Netherlands, took cubes of bioactive glass and implanted them into the tibias of guinea pigs in 1986. After 8, 12, and 16 weeks of implantation, the guinea pigs were euthanized and their tibias were harvested. The implants and tibias were then subjected to a shear strength test to determine the mechanical properties of the implant to bone boundary, where it was found to have a shear strength of 5 N/mm^{2}. Electron microscopy showed the ceramic implants had bone remnants firmly adhered to them. Further optical microscopy revealed bone cell and blood vessel growth within the area of the implant which was proof of biocompatibility between the bone and implant.

Bioactive glass was the first material found to create a strong bond with living bone tissue.

== Structure ==
Solid state NMR spectroscopy has been very useful in determining the structure of amorphous solids. Bioactive glasses have been studied by ^{29}Si and ^{31}P solid state MAS NMR spectroscopy. The chemical shift from MAS NMR is indicative of the type of chemical species present in the glass. The ^{29}Si MAS NMR spectroscopy showed that Bioglass 45S5 was a Q2 type-structure with a small amount of Q3; i.e., silicate chains with a few crosslinks. The ^{31}P MAS NMR revealed predominately Q0 species; i.e., PO_{4}^{3−}; subsequent MAS NMR spectroscopy measurements have shown that Si-O-P bonds are below detectable levels

== Compositions ==
There have been many variations on the original composition which was Food and Drug Administration (FDA) approved and termed Bioglass. This composition is known as Bioglass 45S5. The compositions include:

Molecular Structure of Bioglass

- 45S5: 45 wt% SiO_{2}, 24.5 wt% CaO, 24.5 wt% Na_{2}O and 6.0 wt% P_{2}O_{5}. Bioglass
- S53P4: 53 wt% SiO_{2}, 23 wt% Na_{2}O, 20 wt% CaO and 4 wt% P_{2}O_{5}.
- 58S: 58 wt% SiO_{2}, 33 wt% CaO and 9 wt% P_{2}O_{5}.
- 70S30C: 70 wt% SiO_{2}, 30 wt% CaO.
- 13-93: 53 wt% SiO_{2}, 6 wt% Na_{2}O, 12 wt% K_{2}O, 5 wt% MgO, 20 wt% CaO, 4 wt% P_{2}O_{5}.

=== Bioglass 45S5 ===
The composition was originally selected because of being roughly eutectic.

The 45S5 name signifies glass with 45 wt.% of SiO_{2} and 5:1 molar ratio of calcium to phosphorus. Lower Ca/P ratios do not bond to bone.

The key composition features of Bioglass is that it contains less than 60 mol% SiO_{2}, high Na_{2}O and CaO contents, high CaO/P_{2}O_{5} ratio, which makes Bioglass highly reactive to aqueous medium and bioactive.

High bioactivity is the main advantage of Bioglass, while its disadvantages includes mechanical weakness, low fracture resistance due to amorphous 2-dimensional glass network. The bending strength of most Bioglass is in the range of 40–60 MPa, which is not enough for load-bearing application. Its Young's modulus is 30–35 GPa, very close to that of cortical bone, which can be an advantage. Bioglass implants can be used in non-load-bearing applications, for buried implants loaded slightly or compressively. Bioglass can be also used as a bioactive component in composite materials or as powder and can be used to create an artificial septum to treat perforations caused by cocaine abuse. It has no known side-effects.

The first successful surgical use of Bioglass 45S5 was in replacement of ossicles in middle ear, as a treatment of conductive hearing loss. The advantage of 45S5 is in no tendency to form fibrous tissue. Other uses are in cones for implantation into the jaw following a tooth extraction. Composite materials made of Bioglass 45S5 and patient's own bone can be used for bone reconstruction.

Bioglass is comparatively soft in comparison to other glasses. It can be machined, preferably with diamond tools, or ground to powder. Bioglass has to be stored in a dry environment, as it readily absorbs moisture and reacts with it.

Bioglass 45S5 is manufactured by conventional glass-making technology, using platinum or platinum alloy crucibles to avoid contamination. Contaminants would interfere with the chemical reactivity in organism. Annealing is a crucial step in forming bulk parts, due to high thermal expansion of the material.

Heat treatment of Bioglass reduces the volatile alkali metal oxide content and precipitates apatite crystals in the glass matrix. The resulting glass–ceramic material, named Ceravital, has higher mechanical strength and lower bioactivity.

=== Bioglass S53P4 ===
The formula of S53P4 was first developed in the early 1990s in Turku, Finland, at Åbo Akademi University and University of Turku. It has received the product claim for use in bone cavity filling in the treatment of chronic osteomyelitis in 2011. S53P4 is among the most studied bioactive glasses on the market with over 150 publications.

When S53P4 bioactive glass is placed into the bone cavity, it reacts with body fluids to activate the glass. During this activation period, the bioactive glass goes through a series of chemical reactions, creating the ideal conditions for the bone to rebuild through osteoconduction.

- Na, Si, Ca, and P ions are released.
- A silica gel layer forms on the bioactive glass surface.
- CaP crystallizes, forming a layer of hydroxyapatite on the surface of the bioactive glass.

Once the hydroxyapatite layer is formed, the bioactive glass interacts with biological entities, i.e., blood proteins, growth factors and collagen. Following this interaction, the osteoconductive and osteostimulative processes help the new bone grow onto and between the bioactive glass structures.

- Bioactive glass bonds to bone –facilitating new bone formation.
- Osteostimulation begins by stimulating osteogenic cells to increase the remodeling rate of bone.
- Radio-dense quality of bioactive glass allows for post-operative evaluation.

In the final transformative phase, the process of bone regeneration and remodeling continues. Over time the bone fully regenerates, restoring the patient's natural anatomy.

- Bone consolidation occurs.
- S53P4 bioactive glass continues to remodel into bone over a period of years.

Bioactive glass S53P4 is currently the only bioactive glass on the market which has been proven to inhibit bacterial growth effectively. The bacterial growth inhibiting properties of S53P4 derive from two simultaneous chemical and physical processes, which occurs once the bioactive glass reacts with body fluids. Sodium (Na) is released from the surface of the bioactive glass and induces an increase in pH (alkaline environment), which is not favorable for the bacteria, thus inhibiting their growth. The released Na, Ca, Si and P ions give rise to an increase in osmotic pressure due to an elevation in salt concentration, i.e., an environment where bacteria cannot grow.

=== Bioglass 8625 ===
Bioglass 8625, also called Schott 8625, is a soda–lime glass used for encapsulation of implanted devices. The most common use of Bioglass 8625 is in the housings of RFID transponders for use in human and animal microchip implants. It is patented and manufactured by Schott AG. Bioglass 8625 is also used for some piercings.

Bioglass 8625 does not bond to tissue or bone, it is held in place by fibrous tissue encapsulation. After implantation, a calcium-rich layer forms on the interface between the glass and the tissue. Without additional antimigration coating it is subject to migration in the tissue. The antimigration coating is a material that bonds to both the glass and the tissue. Parylene, usually Parylene type C, is often used as such material.

Bioglass 8625 has a significant content of iron, which provides infrared light absorption and allows sealing by a light source, e.g., a Nd:YAG laser or a mercury-vapor lamp. The content of Fe_{2}O_{3} yields high absorption with maximum at 1100 nm, and gives the glass a green tint. The use of infrared radiation instead of flame or contact heating helps preventing contamination of the device.

After implantation, the glass reacts with the environment in two phases, in the span of about two weeks. In the first phase, alkali metal ions are leached from the glass and replaced with hydrogen ions; small amount of calcium ions also diffuses from the material. During the second phase, the Si-O-Si bonds in the silica matrix undergo hydrolysis, yielding a gel-like surface layer rich on Si-O-H groups. A calcium phosphate-rich passivation layer gradually forms over the surface of the glass, preventing further leaching.

It is used in microchips for tracking of many kinds of animals, and recently in some human implants. The U.S. Food and Drug Administration (FDA) approved use of Bioglass 8625 in humans in 1994.

=== Bioactive glass 13-93 ===
The bioactive glass 13-93 was invented in 1993 by Dr. Maria Brink at Åbo Akademi University. The name 13-93 refers to glass number 13 in a series of more than 40 new glass compositions. Other bioactive glasses of interest in that series are glass 9-93 and glass 17-93. Compared to Bioglass 45S5, silicate 13-93 bioactive glass is composed of a higher composition of SiO_{2} and includes K_{2}O and MgO. It is commercially available from Mo-Sci Corp. or can be directly prepared by melting a mixture of Na_{2}CO_{3}, K_{2}CO_{3}, MgCO_{3}, CaCO_{3}, SiO_{2} and NaH_{2}PO_{4} · 2H_{2}O in a platinum crucible at 1 360 °C and cast in a graphite mould.

The 13-93 glass has received approval for in vivo use in the US and Europe. It has more facile viscous flow behavior and a lower tendency to crystallize upon being pulled into fibers. 13-93 bioactive glass powder could be dispersed into a binder to create ink for robocasting or direct ink 3D printing technique. The mechanical properties of the resulting porous scaffolds have been studied in various works of literature.

The printed 13-93 bioactive glass scaffold in the study by Liu et al. was dried in ambient air, fired to 600 °C under the O_{2} atmosphere to remove the processing additives, and sintered in air for 1 hour at 700 °C. In the pristine sample, the flexural strength (11 ± 3 MPa) and flexural modulus (13 ± 2 MPa) are comparable to the minimum value of those of trabecular bones while the compressive strength (86 ± 9 MPa) and compressive modulus (13 ± 2 GPa) are close to the cortical bone values. However, the fracture toughness of the as-fabricated scaffold was 0.48 ± 0.04 MPa·m^{1/2}, indicating that it is more brittle than human cortical bone whose fracture toughness is 2–12 MPa·m^{1/2}. After immersing the sample in a simulated body fluid (SBF) or subcutaneous implantation in the dorsum of rats, the compressive strength and compressive modulus decrease sharply during the initial two weeks but more gradually after two weeks. The decrease in the mechanical properties was attributed to the partial conversion of the glass filaments in the scaffolds into a layer mainly composed of a porous hydroxyapatite-like material.

Another work by Kolan and co-workers used selective laser sintering instead of conventional heat treatment. After the optimization of the laser power, scan speed, and heating rate, the compressive strength of the sintered scaffolds varied from 41 MPa for a scaffold with ~50% porosity to 157 MPa for dense scaffolds. The in vitro study using SBF resulted in a decrease in the compressive strength but the final value was similar to that of human trabecular bone.

13-93 porous glass scaffolds were synthesized using a polyurethane foam replication method in the report by Fu et al. The stress-strain relationship was examined in obtained from the compressive test using eight samples with 85 ± 2% porosity. The resultant curve demonstrated a progressive breaking down of the scaffold structure and the average compressive strength of 11 ± 1 MPa, which was in the range of human trabecular bone and higher than competitive bioactive materials for bone repairing such as hydroxyapatite scaffolds with the same extent of pores and polymer-ceramic composites prepared by the thermally induced phase separation (TIPS) method.

== Synthesis ==
Bioactive glasses have been synthesized through methods such as conventional melting, quenching, the sol–gel process, flame synthesis, and microwave irradiation. The synthesis of bioglass has been reviewed by various groups, with sol-gel synthesis being one of the most frequently used methods for producing bioglass composites, particularly for tissue engineering applications. Other methods of bioglass synthesis have been developed, such as flame and microwave synthesis, though they are less prevalent in research.

== Bioactive metallic glass ==
Bioactive metallic glass is a subset of bioactive glass, wherein the bulk material is composed of a metal-glass substrate and is coated with bioactive glass in order to make the material bioactive. The reasoning behind the introduction of the metallic base is to create a less brittle, stronger material that will be permanently implanted within the body. Metallic glasses tout lower Young's Moduli and higher elastic limits than bioactive glass, and as such, will allow for more deformation of the material before fracture occurs. This is highly desirable, as a permanent implant would need to avoid shattering within the patient's body. Common materials which compose the metallic bulk include Zr and Ti, whereas some examples of the few key metals that shouldn't be used as bulk materials are Al, Be, and Ni.

=== Laser-cladding ===
While metals are not necessarily inherently bioactive, bioactive glass coatings which are applied to metal substrates via laser-cladding introduce the bioactivity that the glass would express, but have the added benefits of having a metal base.

Laser cladding is a method by which bioactive glass microparticles are thrust in a stream at the bulk material, and introduced to a high enough heat that they melt into a coating of material.

=== Sol-gel processing ===
Metals can also be affixed with bioactive glass using a sol-gel process, in which the bioactive glass is sintered onto metals at a controlled temperature that is high enough to perform the sintering, but low enough to avoid phase-shifts and other unwanted side effects. Experimentation has been done with sintering double layered, silica-based bioactive glass onto stainless steel substrates at 600 °C for 5 hours. This method has proven to maintain largely amorphous structure while containing key crystalline elements, and also achieves a remarkably similar level of bioactivity to bioactive glass.

== Mechanism of activity ==
The underlying mechanisms that enable bioactive glasses to act as materials for bone repair have been investigated since the first work of Hench et al. at the University of Florida. Early attention was paid to changes in the bioactive glass surface. Five inorganic reaction stages are commonly thought to occur when a bioactive glass is immersed in a physiological environment:

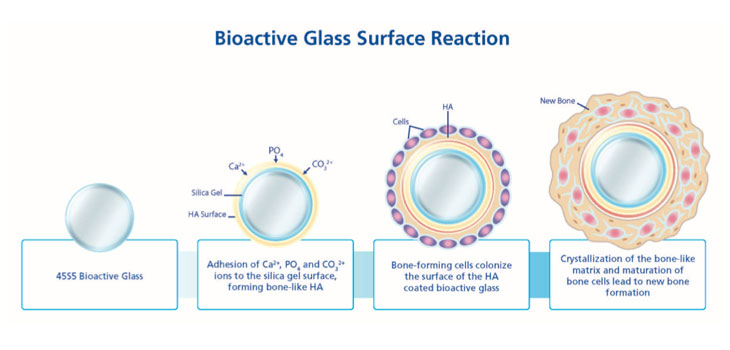
1. A step by step image of the integration of bioactive glass with bone
  Ion exchange in which modifier cations (mostly Na^{+}) in the glass exchange with hydronium ions in the external solution.
2. Hydrolysis in which Si-O-Si bridges are broken, forming Si-OH silanol groups, and the glass network is disrupted.
3. Condensation of silanols in which the disrupted glass network changes its morphology to form a gel-like surface layer, depleted in sodium and calcium ions.
4. Precipitation in which an amorphous calcium phosphate layer is deposited on the gel.
5. Mineralization in which the calcium phosphate layer gradually transforms into crystalline hydroxyapatite, that mimics the mineral phase naturally contained with vertebrate bones.

Later, it was discovered that the morphology of the gel surface layer was a key component in determining the bioactive response. This was supported by studies on bioactive glasses derived from sol-gel processing. Such glasses could contain significantly higher concentrations of SiO_{2} than traditional melt-derived bioactive glasses and still maintain bioactivity (i.e., the ability to form a mineralized hydroxyapatite layer on the surface). The inherent porosity of the sol-gel-derived material was cited as a possible explanation for why bioactivity was retained, and often enhanced with respect to the melt-derived glass.

Subsequent advances in DNA microarray technology enabled an entirely new perspective on the mechanisms of bioactivity in bioactive glasses. Previously, it was known that a complex interplay existed between bioactive glasses and the molecular biology of the implant host, but the available tools did not provide a sufficient quantity of information to develop a holistic picture. Using DNA microarrays, researchers are now able to identify entire classes of genes that are regulated by the dissolution products of bioactive glasses, resulting in the so-called "genetic theory" of bioactive glasses. The first microarray studies on bioactive glasses demonstrated that genes associated with osteoblast growth and differentiation, maintenance of extracellular matrix, and promotion of cell-cell and cell-matrix adhesion were up-regulated by conditioned cell culture media containing the dissolution products of bioactive glass.

== Medical uses ==
S53P4 bioactive glass was first used in a clinical setting as an alternative to bone or cartilage grafts in facial reconstruction surgery. The use of artificial materials as bone prosthesis had the advantage of being much more versatile than traditional autotransplants, as well as having fewer postoperative side effects.

There is tentative evidence that bioactive glass by the composition S53P4 may also be useful in long bone infections. Support from randomized controlled trials, however, is still not available as of 2015.

Novamin, a toothpaste additive that contains 45S5 bioactive glass, has been shown to significantly reduce dental sensitivity as indicated in a randomized controlled trial.

== See also ==
- Ceramic foam
- Nanofoam
- Metal foam
- Osseointegration
- Porous medium
- Synthesis of bioglass
