= Mechanical properties of biomaterials =

Materials that are used for biomedical or clinical applications are known as biomaterials. The following article deals with fifth generation biomaterials that are used for bone structure replacement. For any material to be classified for biomedical applications, three requirements must be met. The first requirement is that the material must be biocompatible; it means that the organism should not treat it as a foreign object. Secondly, the material should be biodegradable (for in-graft only); the material should harmlessly degrade or dissolve in the body of the organism to allow it to resume natural functioning. Thirdly, the material should be mechanically sound; for the replacement of load-bearing structures, the material should possess equivalent or greater mechanical stability to ensure high reliability of the graft.

== Introduction ==
The biomaterial term is used for materials that can be used in biomedical and clinical applications. They are bioactive and biocompatible in nature. Currently, many types of metals and alloys (stainless steel, titanium, nickel, magnesium, Co–Cr alloys, Ti alloys), ceramics (zirconia, bioglass, alumina, hydroxyapatite) and polymers (acrylic, nylon, silicone, polyurethane, polycaprolactone, polyanhydrides) are used for load bearing applications. This includes dental replacements and bone joining or replacements for medical and clinical application. Therefore, their mechanical properties are very important. Mechanical properties of some biomaterials and bone are summarized in Table 1. Among them, hydroxyapatite is most widely studied bioactive and biocompatible material. However, it has lower Young's modulus and fracture toughness with a brittle nature. Hence, it is required to produce a biomaterial with good mechanical properties.

== Elastic modulus ==
Elastic modulus is simply defined as the ratio of stress to strain within the proportional limit. Physically, it represents the stiffness of a material within the elastic range when tensile or compressive loads are applied. It is clinically important because it indicates the selected biomaterial has similar deformable properties with the material it is going to replace. These force-bearing materials require high elastic modulus with low deflection. As the elastic modulus of material increases, fracture resistance decreases. It is desirable that the biomaterial elastic modulus is similar to that of bone. This is because if it is more than bone's elastic modulus then the load is borne by the material only; while the load is borne by bone only if it is less than bone material. The elastic modulus of a material is generally calculated by the bending test, because deflection can be easily measured in this case as compared to very small elongation in compressive or tensile load. However, biomaterials (for bone replacement) are usually porous and the sizes of the samples are small. Therefore, the nanoindentation test is used to determine the elastic modulus of these materials. This method has high precision and is convenient for micro-scale samples. Another method of elastic modulus measurement is the non-destructive method. It is also a clinically very good method because of its simplicity and repeatability since materials are not destroyed.

== Hardness ==
Hardness is a measure of plastic deformation and is defined as the force per unit area of indentation or penetration. Hardness is one of the most important parameters for comparing properties of materials. It is used for finding the suitability of the clinical use of biomaterials. Biomaterial hardness is desirable as equal to bone hardness. If higher than the biomaterial, then it penetrates in the bone. Higher hardness results in less abrasion. As said above, biomaterials sample are very small, therefore micro- and nano-scale hardness tests (Diamond Knoop and Vickers indenters) are used.

== Fracture strength ==
The strength of a material is defined as the maximum stress that can be endured before fracture occurs. Strength of biomaterials (bioceramics) is an important mechanical property because they are brittle. In brittle materials like bioceramics, cracks easily propagate when the material is subject to tensile loading, unlike compressive loading. A number of methods are available for determining the tensile strength of materials, such as the bending flexural test, the biaxial flexural strength test and the weibull approach. In bioceramics, flaws influence the reliability and strength of the material during implantation and fabrication. There are a number of ways that flaws can be produced in bioceramics such as thermal sintering and heating. It is important for bioceramics to have high reliability, rather than high strength.

The strength of brittle materials depends on the size of flaws distributed throughout the material. According to Griffith's theory of fracture in tension, the largest flaw or crack will contribute the most to the failure of a material. Strength also depends on the volume of a specimen since flaw size is limited to the size of the specimen's cross section. Therefore, the smaller the specimen (e.g., fibers), the higher the fracture strength. Porosity of implanted bioceramic has a tremendous influence on the physical properties. Pores are usually formed during processing of materials. Increasing the porosity and pore size means increasing the relative void volume and decreasing density; this leads to a reduction in mechanical properties and lowers the overall strength of bioceramic.

To use ceramics as self-standing implants that are able to withstand tensile stresses is a primary engineering design objective. Four general approaches have been used to achieve this objective: 1) use of the bioactive ceramic as a coating on a metal or ceramic substrate 2)strengthening of the ceramic, such as via crystallization of glass 3) use of fracture mechanics as a design approach and 4) reinforcing of the ceramic with a second phase.

For example, hydroxyapatite and other calcium phosphates bioceramics are important for hard tissue repair because of their similarity to the minerals in natural bone, and their excellent biocompatibility and bioactivity, but they have poor fatigue resistance and strength. Hence, bioinert ceramic oxides with high strength are used to enhance the densification and the mechanical properties of them.

== Fracture toughness ==
Fracture toughness is required to alter the crack propagation in ceramics. It is helpful to evaluate the serviceability, performance and long term clinical success of biomaterials. It is reported that the high fracture toughness material improved clinical performance and reliability as compare to low fracture toughness. It can be measured by many methods e.g. indentation fracture, indentation strength, single edge notched beam, single edge pre cracked beam and double cantilever beam.

== Fatigue ==
Fatigue is defined as failure of a material due to repeated/cyclic loading or unloading (tensile or compressive stresses). It is also an important parameter for biomaterial because cyclic load is applied during their serving life. In this cyclic loading condition, micro crack/flaws may be generated at the interface of the matrix and the filler. This micro crack can initiate permanent plastic deformation which results in large crack propagation or failure. During the cyclic load several factor also contribute to microcrack generation such as frictional sliding of the mating surface, progressive wear, residual stresses at grain boundaries, stress due to shear.

Table 1: Summary of mechanical properties of cortical bone and biomaterial

Material	Tensile strength (MPa)	Compressive strength (MPa)	Elastic modulus (GPa)	Fracture toughness (MPa. m^{−1/2})
Bioglass	42	500	35	2
Cortical Bone	50–151	100–230	7–30	2–12
Titanium	345	250–600	102.7	58-66
Stainless steel	465–950	1000	200	55–95
Ti-Alloys	596–1100	450–1850	55–114	40–92
Alumina	270–500	3000–5000	380–410	5–6
Hydroxyapatites	40–300	500–1000	80–120	0.6–1

Fatigue fracture and wear have been identified as some of the major problems associated with implant loosening, stress-shielding and ultimate implant failure. Although wear is commonly reported in orthopaedic applications such as knee and hip joint prostheses, it is also a serious and often fatal experience in mechanical heart valves. The selection of biomaterials for wear resistance unfortunately cannot rely only on conventional thinking of using hard ceramics, because of their low coefficient of friction and high modulus of elasticity. This is because ceramics are generally prone to brittle fracture (having a fracture toughness typically less than 1 MPa√m) and need absolute quality control to avoid fatigue fracture for medical device applications. The development of fatigue fracture and wear resistant biomaterials looks into the biocomposites of two or more different phases such as in interpenetrating network composites. The advantage of these composites is that one can incorporate controlled drug release chemicals, friction modifiers, different morphologies to enable better host–implant performance and chemical entities to reduce or aid removal of wear debris. Of equal importance are the tools developed to predict fatigue fracture/wear using new methodologies involving in vitro tests, computational modelling to obtain design stresses and fracture/wear maps to identify mechanisms.

== Viscoelasticity ==
Viscoelasticity, a material property characterized by the extrusion of dual solid and liquid-like behaviors, is typically found in an array of polymer-based biomaterials, including those used in biomedical devices as well as in clinical settings. From polymer-based surface coatings on drug-eluting stents to entangled tissue networks that have load-bearing capabilities and hydrogels that possess complex crosslinks, all of these examples display viscoelastic behavior. Often times, flow plasticity theory and linear elasticity are utilized to describe the rheological behavior of metals and other hard materials, yet they are not commonly used to elaborate on the material behavior of biomaterials. Viscoelasticity is often described in terms of its time-dependent material properties associated with its characteristic stress relaxation time. Additionally, the energy dissipation associated with the liquid-like portion of the response to an applied load can be funneled into the complex modulus, which is represented by two distinct categories: one real and one imaginary, for the viscoelastic response^{[10]}. The viscoelastic response of a biomaterial can be modeled by linear mathematical models, and atypically a non-linear mathematical models that corresponds to the loading capabilities of the biomaterial in use.

=== Viscoelasticity in polymeric biomaterials ===
There is a tendency for polymeric biomaterials to display the same characteristics as solid, rigid materials over a short time span, in addition to exhibiting exceptional flow behavior over longer periods of time. This translates to long-term analysis and studies focused towards ensuring the mechanical integrity of these biomaterials to prevent potential deformation and mechanical failure once employed in a clinical setting. The viscoelastic behavior is typically dependent on factors such as the crosslink density, the average molecular weight, the degree of crystallinity, and the degree of entanglement as well as the general chemistry of the biomaterial. There are modeling programs employed to probe the material behavior over an array of temperatures and applied frequencies, as well as to decrease the potential for complexity in synthesizing polymers at the industrial level and for commercial use. The programs themselves often focus on decreasing the rate of mechanical and environmental degradation by focusing on probing the rate sensitivity as well as creep response^{[11]}. For example, in polymeric grafts that act as replacements for tissues, the viscoelastic response is necessary to be mimicked to ensure ample biocompatibility and structural stability over the life-span of the material.

=== Viscoelasticity in tissue ===
Tissues themselves are, at their fundamental level, an amalgamation of entangled and crosslinked polymer networks that are composed of collagen, other organic compounds found in the human body, and long polymer chain structures. The degree at which entanglement occurs, crosslinking behavior between other compounds, and the interpenetration ability of excess polymer networks determines the outstanding character of a tissue network. Everything from macroscopic structural to atomistic-level arrangements in a tissue, such as the crimping behavior seen in tendons, can give way to nonlinear elastic behavior which can be highly expressed due to the intermolecular arrangements within the material. Since tissues are hydrolyzed to maintain biological function, this often affects their mechanical performance as it often results in the liquid component affecting the deformation response of the material. Additionally, the degree of crosslinking present in an individual crosslinked collagen network can be prone to the biological environment of said crosslinked network^{[12]}. With that in mind, the time-dependent mechanical properties of tissues can be incredibly interdependent on molecular interactions and the chemical environment in which a specific tissue is native to. In comparison to other tissue, articular cartilage itself begins to enlarge when subjected to unloading and this puts the microstructure of the material into a state of tension. Articular cartilage, a native biomaterial, typically supplies a soft base for tail end of narrow bones located in synovial joints while providing lubrication capabilities that allow joints to interact without excess friction. The cartilage itself is composed of collagen fiber within an entangled gel-like structure. This tissue structure behaves similar to a viscoelastic solid in the sense that the response to strain under an excess load is dependent on the rate of the load. Furthermore, when a mechanical load is applied to the tissue, the fluid is forced out of the porous membranes of the biomaterial which exacerbates permanent deformation, while simultaneously stifling viscous flow and decreasing energy in the material overall. Overall, the viscoelastic characteristics and the viscous attributes in the liquid phase play a role in the dynamic behavior of tissue, and tissue-based materials.

== See also ==
- Artificial bone
- Biomaterials
- Stress
- Strain
- Hooke's law
- Shear modulus
- Bending stiffness
- Toughness
