= Texnikoi =

Honor society at Ohio State University, US

- TNK
- Founded: November 5, 1924; 102 years ago Ohio State University
- Type: Honor
- Affiliation: Independent
- Status: Active
- Emphasis: Engineering
- Scope: Local
- Pillars: Participation, Leadership, Service
- Colors: Black and Yellow
- Chapters: 1
- Headquarters: 2070 Neil Avenue; Columbus, Ohio 43210; United States
- Website: texnikoi.osu.edu

Texnikoi (TNK) is an honorary organization for students in the College of Engineering at Ohio State University in Columbus, Ohio, United States. It was established in 1924 and recognizes both academic achievement and campus and extra-curricular involvement.

== History ==
Texnikoi Engineering Honorary Fraternity was founded on November 5, 1924 at Ohio State University as an honorary organization for students in the College of Engineering. At the time this organization was founded, many students felt that some effort should be made to recognize outstanding work in the extra-curricular field. The founders of Texnikoi include:

- Arthur C. Avril
- Peter B. Baggs
- Edward Burkhalter
- Jesse R. Glaeser
- Richard R. Grant
- Charles L. Lockett
- Howard L. Matthews
- Donald F. McChurchy
- George R. Miller
- Loren A. Murphy
- Herman F. Nofer
- Albert Ward Ross Jr.
- Hoyt L. Sherman
- Edmund D. Watts
- Rolland P. Wood
- Clarence T. Woodward

Its purpose is to give due recognition to those members of the College of Engineering who have distinguished themselves as campus leaders while maintaining, at the same time, a commendable academic record. Avril was the main founder and first president of the organization. Although he graduated from Ohio State in 1925, he remained in close contact with Texnikoi until he died in July 1996.

In 1989, Avril raised close to $250,000 for the Texnikoi by auctioning off his 1954 Mercedes Benz 300SL Gullwing. This donation has allowed for the thousands of dollars in scholarships for outstanding members and for the coverage of operating expenses of the society

== Symbols ==
Texnikoi's colors are black and yellow.

The three main values of Texnikoi are:

- Participation in activities
- Leadership in organizations
- Service to the university and the community

The Texnikoi plaque is a hand-crafted representation of the Texnikoi symbol. At the beginning of every initiation period, members are instructed to make a plaque to represent the symbol of Texnikoi. Initiates are only given an unfinished die cast of the TNK symbol and criteria as to which the aspects of the plaque must fall into. Plaques are due before initiation and then given back to the newly initiated members as a symbol of membership. Alumni who have lost their plaques may request a new one be made by contacting the current President or Adviser of Texnikoi.

== Activities ==
Texnikoi meets once a month during the regular school year. Meetings serve two purposes: i) to inform members of the upcoming service, philanthropy, and social events, and ii) to allow engineers to meet other engineers and create a social network.

Each year the active membership of Texnikoi selects an alumnus of the College of Engineering to receive the Texnikoi Outstanding Alumni Award. The award was first presented in 1955. Recipients are under the age of forty, have risen rapidly in the field of engineering, have made outstanding contributions through civic and social activities, and has not received prior departmental recognition. The precedence has been established that a department should not be considered for two years after one of its alumni receives the award. Notable recipients of the award include Tamer Ibrahim in 2013.

The society also awards scholarships to its members annually.

== Membership ==
Texnikoi admits 25 inductees each year, from a variety of engineering specializations. Potential members must be an engineering student at Ohio State University with an above-average cumulative GPA and a status of at least sophomore. Members are then chosen by their level of extra-curricular activity. The number of activities participated in by a student is not necessarily indicative of his/her qualification for membership in this fraternity, but rather how he/she has assumed active leadership, administrative ability, and integrity.Membership applications are reviewed annually in early November.

== Notable members ==
- Arthur C. Avril, founder of Sakrete and the inventor of the bagged concrete industry
- Larry L. Hench, emeritus professor at the University of Florida and chair of the Ceramic Materials Department at Imperial College London; inventor of Bioglass 45S5
