= Growth factor =

Protein or other substance that stimulates cellular proliferation

A growth factor is a naturally occurring substance capable of stimulating cell proliferation, wound healing, and occasionally cellular differentiation. Usually it is a secreted protein or a steroid hormone.

== Comparison to cytokines ==
Growth factor is sometimes used interchangeably among scientists with the term cytokine. Historically, cytokines were associated with hematopoietic (blood and lymph forming) cells and immune system cells (e.g., lymphocytes and tissue cells from spleen, thymus, and lymph nodes). For the circulatory system and bone marrow in which cells can occur in a liquid suspension and not bound up in solid tissue, it makes sense for them to communicate by soluble, circulating protein molecules. However, as different lines of research converged, it became clear that some of the same signaling proteins which the hematopoietic and immune systems use were also being used by all sorts of other cells and tissues, during development and in the mature organism.

While growth factor implies a positive effect on cell proliferation, cytokine is a neutral term with respect to whether a molecule affects proliferation. While some cytokines can be growth factors, such as G-CSF and GM-CSF, others have an inhibitory effect on cell growth or cell proliferation. Some cytokines, such as Fas ligand, are used as "death" signals; they cause target cells to undergo programmed cell death or apoptosis.

== Examples ==
Polypeptide growth factors include:

| Sr.No | Growth factor | Source | Major function |
|---|---|---|---|
| 1 | Epidermal growth factor (EGF) | Salivary gland | Stimulates growth of epidermal and epithelial cells |
| 2 | Platelet derived growth factor | Platelets | Stimulates growth of mesenchymal cells, promotes wound healing |
| 3 | Transforming growth factor-alpha (TGF-α) | Epithelial cell | Similar to EGF |
| 4 | Transforming growth factor-beta (TGF-β) | Platelets, Kidney, Placenta | Inhibitory effect on cultures tumor cell |
| 5 | Erythropoietin | Kidney | Stimulates development of erythropoietic cells |
| 6 | Nerve growth factor (NGF) | Salivary gland | Stimulates the growth of sensory nerves |
| 7 | Insulin-like growth factor | Serum | Stimulates incorporation of sulfates into cartilage, exerts insulin-like action on certain cells |
| 8 | Tumor necrosis factor | Monocytes | Necrosis of tumor cells |
| 9 | Interleukin-1 | Monocytes, Leukocytes | Stimulates synthesis of IL-2 |
| 10 | Interleukin-2 | Lymphocytes | Stimulates growth and maturation of T-cells |

== List of classes ==
Individual growth factor proteins tend to occur as members of larger families of structurally and evolutionarily related proteins. There are many families, some of which are listed below:

- Adrenomedullin (AM)
- Angiopoietin (Ang)
- Autocrine motility factor
- Bone morphogenetic proteins (BMPs)
- Ciliary neurotrophic factor family
- Colony-stimulating factors
- Epidermal growth factor (EGF)
- Ephrin
- Fibroblast growth factor (FGF)
- Foetal Bovine Somatotrophin (FBS)
- GDNF family of ligands
- Growth differentiation factor-9 (GDF9)
- Hepatocyte growth factor (HGF)
- Hepatoma-derived growth factor (HDGF)
- Insulin
- Insulin-like growth factors
- Interleukins
- Keratinocyte growth factor (KGF)
- Migration-stimulating factor (MSF)
- Macrophage-stimulating protein (MSP), also known as hepatocyte growth factor-like protein (HGFLP)
- Myostatin (GDF-8)
- Neuregulins
- Neurotrophins
- Placental growth factor (PGF)
- Platelet-derived growth factor (PDGF)
- Transforming growth factors
- Vascular endothelial growth factor (VEGF)

== In platelets ==
The alpha granules in blood platelets contain growth factors PDGF, IGF-1, EGF, and TGF-β which begin healing of wounds by attracting and activating macrophages, fibroblasts, and endothelial cells.

== Uses in medicine ==
For the last two decades, growth factors have been increasingly used in the treatment of hematologic and oncologic diseases and cardiovascular diseases such as:

- skin wound healing and regeneration of other tissues such as bone (PDGF-BB)
- neutropenia
- myelodysplastic syndrome (MDS)
- leukemias
- aplastic anaemia
- bone marrow transplantation
- angiogenesis for cardiovascular diseases

== See also ==
- Angiogenesis
- Bone growth factor
- Cytokine
- Growth factor receptor
- Human Genome Organisation
- Mitogen
- Neurotrophic factor
- Receptor (biochemistry)
- Signal transduction
- Wound healing § Overview of involved growth factors
