= Alloplasty =

Surgical procedure

Alloplasty is a surgical procedure performed to substitute and repair defects within the body with the use of synthetic material. It can also be performed in order to bridge wounds. The process of undergoing alloplasty involves the construction of an alloplastic graft through the use of computed tomography (CT), rapid prototyping and "the use of computer-assisted virtual model surgery." Each alloplastic graft is individually constructed and customised according to the patient's defect to address their personal health issue. Alloplasty can be applied in the form of reconstructive surgery. An example where alloplasty is applied in reconstructive surgery is in aiding cranial defects. The insertion and fixation of alloplastic implants can also be applied in cosmetic enhancement and augmentation. Since the inception of alloplasty, it has been proposed that it could be a viable alternative to other forms of transplants. The biocompatibility and customisation of alloplastic implants and grafts provides a method that may be suitable for both minor and major medical cases that may have more limitations in surgical approach. Although there has been evidence that alloplasty is a viable method for repairing and substituting defects, there are disadvantages including suitability of patient bone quality and quantity for long term implant stability, possibility of rejection of the alloplastic implant, injuring surrounding nerves, cost of procedure and long recovery times. Complications can also occur from inadequate engineering of alloplastic implants and grafts, and poor implant fixation to bone. These include infection, inflammatory reactions, the fracture of alloplastic implants and prostheses, loosening of implants or reduced or complete loss of osseointegration.

== Procedure ==
Alloplastic bone packed into socket for maxillary canine, then covered with gingival graft

Generally, alloplasty requires resource-intensive preparation including a computed tomography (CT) scan of the patient. Following the CT scan, computer-assisted design technology such as interactive virtual surgical planning software, is used to design a surgical simulation. The surgical simulation produced can be utilised to manipulate the 3D CT model to "preplan the resection, design cutting guides, and choose the appropriate stock prosthesis size". To further improve the safety and outcomes of alloplasty, additive manufacturing technology such as the use of rapid prototyping, fabricates stereolithographic models and cutting guides to be used in the operating room to improve surgical performance.

Prior to the surgical procedure, the alloplastic implant that will be used to repair or substitute the patients defect is designed to be biocompatible with the patient's specific body tissue. The purpose and longevity of the alloplastic implant is also taken into account when considering the materials that are used to create the implant and the structure in order to be able to fixate the implant into the body safely and securely. Preventative measures taken to minimise infection include alloplastic implants being thoroughly sterilised through the administration of antibiotics, the implant acting as an antibiotic carrier. The administration of an antibiotic above the minimum biofilm eradication concentration can act as a protective barrier to bacterial adhesion but can also eradicate biofilm remnants. Another preventative measure to minimise infection is topical antiseptic cleaning in the area of operation. Patients prior to surgical procedure are to be placed on strict hygiene programs to minimise the production of harmful bacteria that may cause infection. Infection can delay the surgical procedure of the alloplastic implant which would cause the patient to further endure the disadvantages of their defect.

After completion of surgical preparation and the creation of a final stock prosthesis, the commencement of the surgical procedure, alloplasty, begins. Alloplasty is performed with the use of anaesthesia. The type of anaesthesia is dependent upon the location of the insertion of the alloplastic implant and the severity of the patient's case, but commonly general anaesthetic and local anaesthetic are utilised. General anaesthetic is applied in major cases but for minor cases, the patient is put under local anaesthetic and intravenous sedation. Once the patient is under anaesthetic, surgeons make the appropriate dissections to insert and stabilise the alloplastic implants. Post-surgery the patient is monitored over a period of time to identify whether the implant has successfully repaired or substituted the defect of concern, and if infection is present.

== Surgical techniques ==
=== Fixation of alloplastic implants ===
Alloplastic implants are osteoconductive and can bridge wounds by osseointegration. After the initial insertion of an alloplastic implant, the implant acts as a guide and pathway for the continuum of bone and tissue reproduction. The alloplastic implant becomes more stabilised and integrated into the surrounding bone as bone production progresses, fixating the implant. Initially the method to fixate alloplastic implants is by using miniplates and screws to directly attach the implant to the bone to mechanically stabilise it. In alloplastic surgeries that involve smaller implants, the screw themselves can be used as implants. For example, dental implants can be found in the form of screws. There are two type of screw designs that are suitable as dental implants, screw-root form and plateau-root form designed screws. The two screw designs have different osseointegration outcomes, longevity and healing processes. The screw-root form design is directly threaded into bone and has macroscopic retentive elements for initial bone fixation. A direct connection between bone and the implant provides high initial stability. Over time, screw-root form designs experience bone resorption and "bone modelling and remodelling at the bone to implant interface".

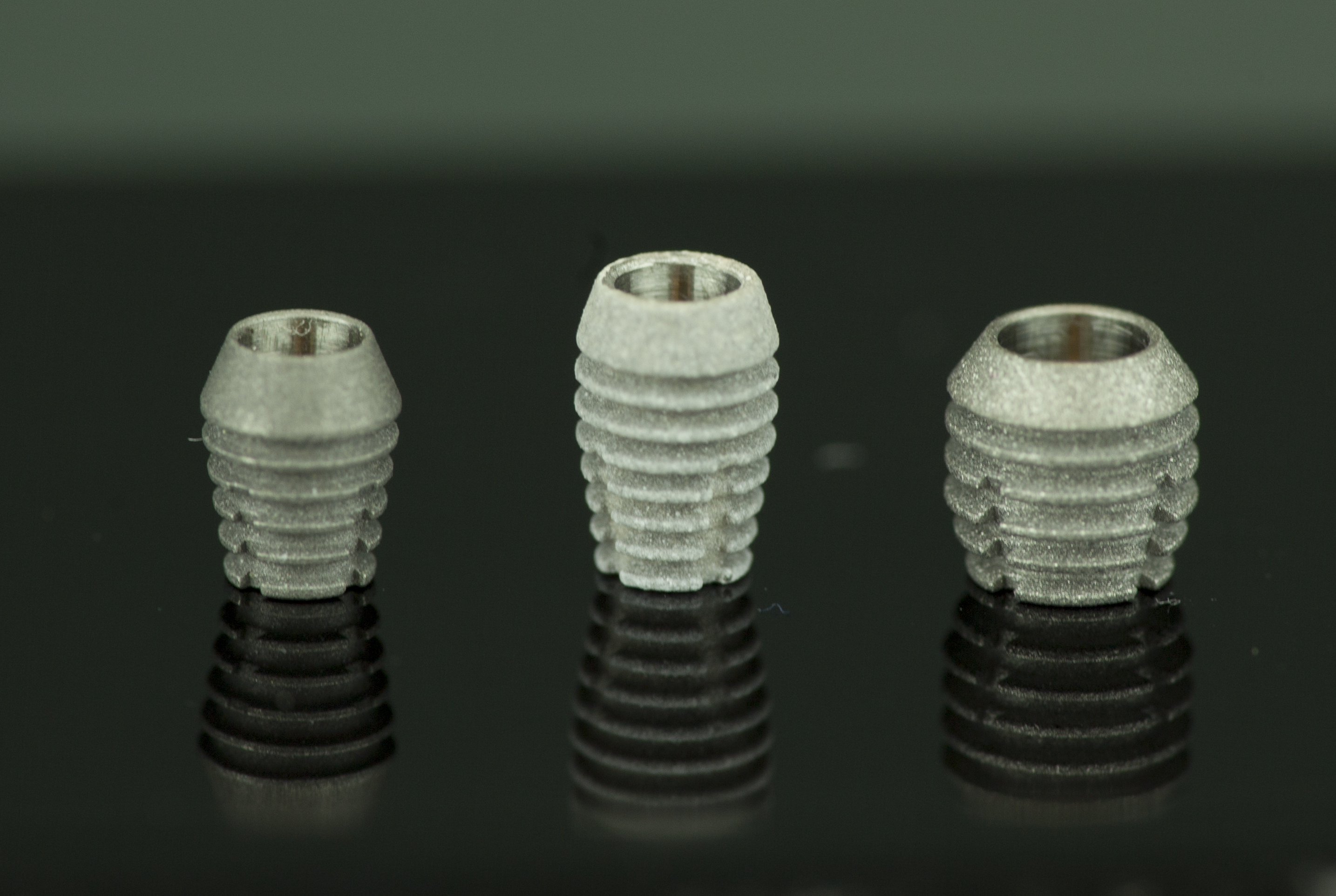
Plateau-root form dental implants of 3 different sizes

Plateau-root form designed implants have a different healing process to screw-root form designs. The plateau-root form design has a woven bone formation. In the 0-3 month bone healing phase, osseointegration occurs by intramembranous ossification. Intramembranous ossification provides greater stabilisation and a more significant role in peri-implant bone healing around plateau-root form implants than screw-root form designed implants.

Miniscrews are another type of implant that can be used to anchor and intrude hard surfaces, such as teeth. This type of implant can stabilise intrusive movement to a certain extent with a varying percentage of relapse of intrusion. Advantages of miniscrews are that they are easily inserted and removed, cheaper compared to other implants, are flexible in regards to insertion sites and cause a lower level of discomfort for the patient. Miniscrews are also able to provide stability without flap surgery and has a "short healing period and immediate loading".

The approach for the fixation of alloplastic implants will be dependent upon the circumstance of the surgical operation and the required stability of the implant. Some patients will require a combination of approaches. The approach taken to surgically fixate an alloplastic implant can also because of the type of synthetic material that the implant is made of to suit its purposes. The alloplastic implant must also be biocompatible with the hosts tissues by being "non-toxic, non-allergenic, non-carcinogenic and non-inflammatory".

== Current use in Medicine ==
=== Defect reconstruction ===
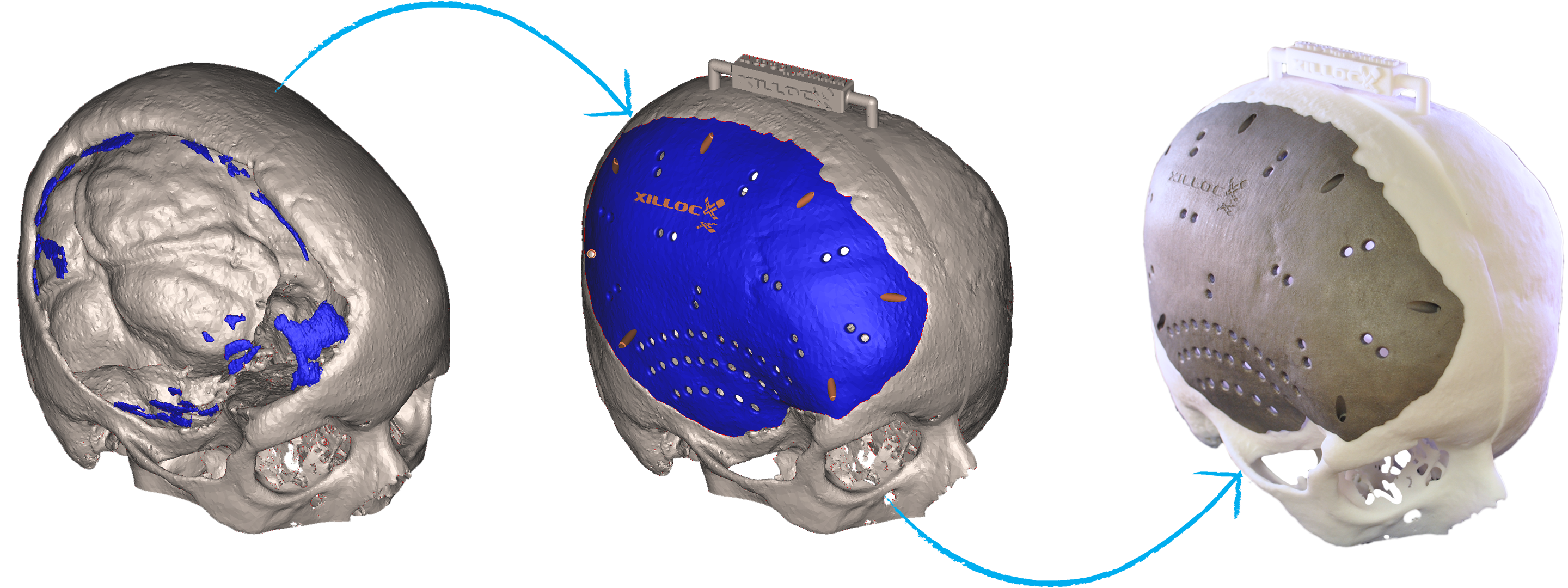
Implant creation sequence: CT scan to CAD to 3D printed titanium cranial implant

Alloplasty is a method for synthetic implants to be inserted into the body to aid physical and mental function. The procedure can be performed to reconstruct defects such as cranial defects. A common synthetic material used in the production of alloplastic grafts for craniotomy is heat-cure polymethyl methacrylate resin due to being nonconductive, radiolucent, light in weight and is easily modified to smoothly mould to the shape of the skull. The non-conduciveness and biocompatibility of polymethyl methacrylate resin and alloplastic materials in general, provides the ability for alloplastic implants to be used in aiding brain defects that may have been caused by decompressive craniectomy. Porous titanium implants can also be used to correct calvarial defects such as "subdural hematoma and meningioma". Implants promote bone formation in osseous defects created by trauma or surgical intervention. Custom stock prosthetic implants reconstruct the cranial defects where the skull is too fragmented to be recovered or where bone has become infected and is required to be replaced. Cranial implants are placed and secured through surgical stabilisation using surgical wires, mini plates and screws to fill gaps in the bone of the skull, called the bone flap. The conduct of alloplasty on the cranium restores lost or deficient use of the brain through the repair of mechanical defects, but is also able to provide fixations for cosmetic purposes to restore natural anatomy.

=== Cosmetic enhancement and augmentation ===
Alloplastic implants can be used in cosmetic facial surgery to restore volume in areas of the face and "can be serviced or removed without maximally invasive surgery". Implants ideally are "nonantigenic, durable, non-toxic and resistant to infection". Cosmetic enhancement can be desired for multiple reasons including the physical changes associated with ageing. The continuous change in facial structure and need for volume restoration due to ageing requires implants that can be easily replaced, cost effective, permanent if desired and a reversible procedure. Silicone implants can provide a three-dimensional (3D) augmentation when anchored to the facial skeleton with screws. Implants made from silicone are able to be replaced and reversed in procedure as the silicone is not integrated into skin tissue but is surrounded by a dense and fibrous tissue capsule. Other materials alloplastic implants are made of for cosmetic enhancement include "expanded polytetrafluorethylene and porous polyethylene" which are all biocompatible".

Facial implants that are left immobilised and that create pressure against bone can cause bone resorption. For example, chin implants that are immobilised create pressure on the anterior mandible which can cause an increase in bone resorption. Facial implants that are placed in a supraperiosteal plane centrally and subperiosteal plane laterally minimise bone resorption. The supraperiosteal plane placement of the implant minimises the degree of contact to the bone as the implant is immobilised and the subperiosteal plane has lateral pockets that fixate the implant. Chin implants can also be fixated and equally remove pressure from bone through the use of screw fixation.

== Adverse effects ==
=== Disadvantages ===
A disadvantage of alloplasty is that there are certain requirements for a patient to have long term stability of an alloplastic implant. This can be dependent upon age and health conditions of the patient. The patient must have sufficient maintenance of alveolar bone structure and minimise alveolar bone loss. For example, the removal of teeth results in accelerated loss of facial bone with the alveolar bone receding, resorbing and then disappearing. In the span of 2–3 years, patients can experience 40-60% of alveolar bone loss. Severe bone and tissue loss can make it difficult for the proceeding with alloplasty as procedural plans about regenerating bone through alloplastic implants become more complex.

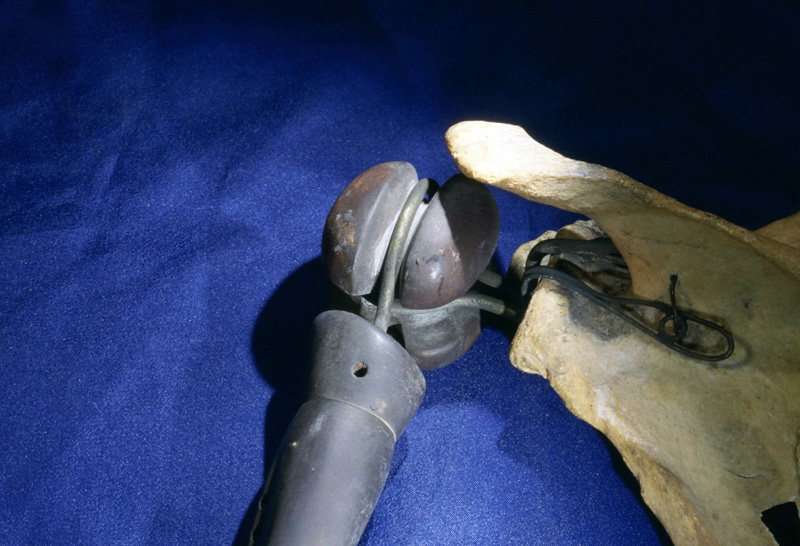
Mock up of artificial shoulder implant that remained in a patient for two years, until removed due to infection.

Another disadvantage with alloplasty is that alloplastic grafts and implants can cause inflammation or be completely rejected by the body and needs to be removed. Alloplasty as a form of reconstructive surgery can be expensive. The need to remove and replace a rejected alloplastic graft or implant increases costs for the patient and prolongs the time the patient must endure the defect of concern. For patients that are successful with alloplasty, may experience long recovery times. This is because the patient's body needs to adapt to the foreign material and integrate the alloplastic implant or graft with its surrounding tissue.

The surgical technique of alloplasty if completed incorrectly can cause significant and irreversible damage to surrounding nerves by the improper placement of osteotomy. For example, in osteoplastic genioplasty, the risk of injuring a mental nerve is high. If the mental nerve injured or damaged, the lower lip and front of the chin can perceptually feel numb.

=== Complications ===
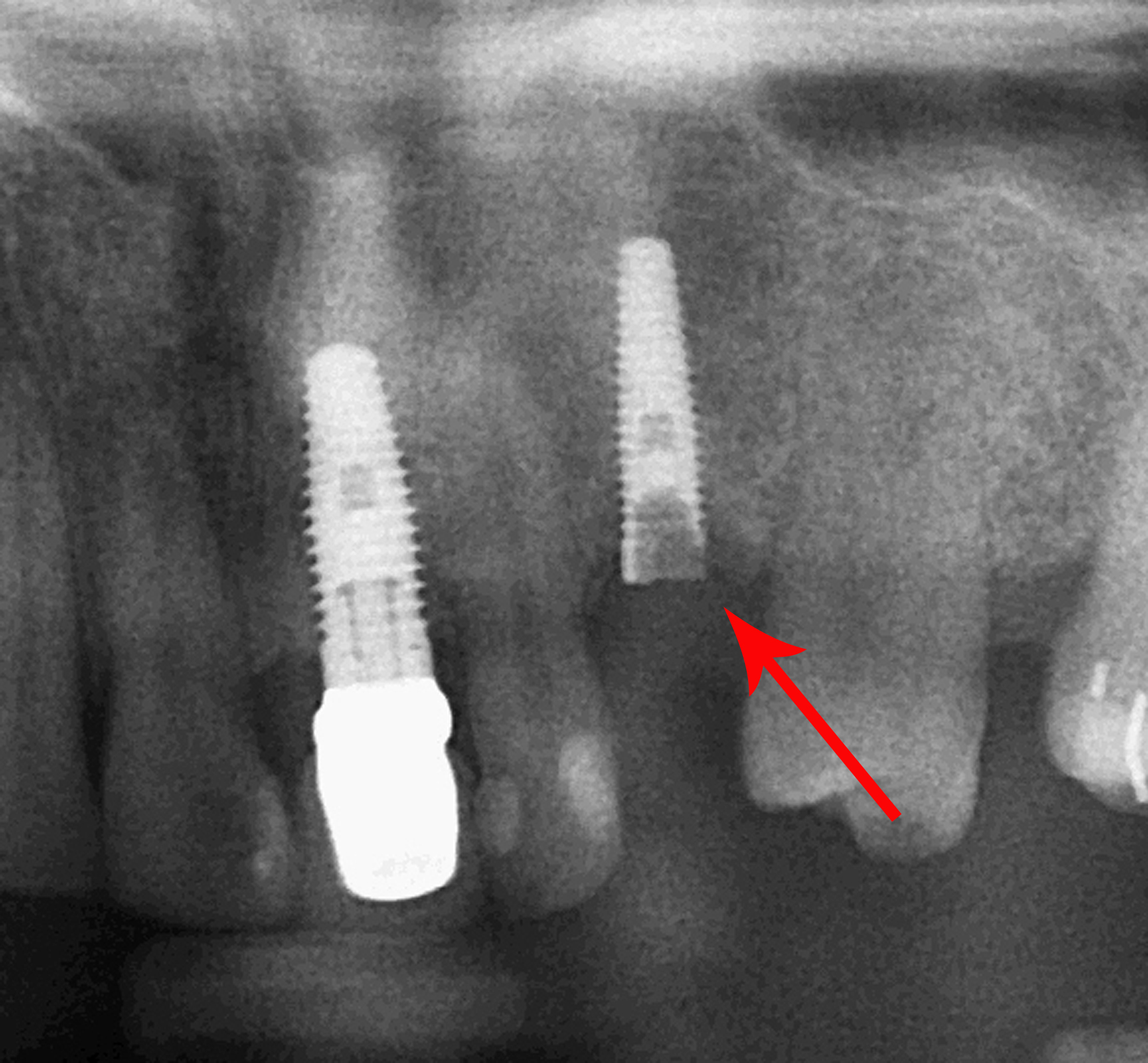
Fractured implant and abutment screw in tooth socket

Although evidence gathered by case-by-case studies have proposed that alloplasty is a viable alternative to other forms of transplants, there can be complications. Alloplastic implants that are not thoroughly sanitised can be contaminated. Contaminated implants attached to a surface in the body creates an enclosed slimy matrix called biofilm, which protects bacterial organisms from the body's defence mechanisms and antibiotics. The bacteria can infect the bloodstream and cause body tissues to become dysfunctional and suppress the body's immune system. A suppressed immune system exacerbates the growth of invading bacteria. Infection is predominant cause of removal of alloplastic implants. A disadvantage of the removal of an infected implant is that bone defects that the implant was responsible for, continue to exist. Another complication is that some synthetic organic materials such as fisiograft, that are used to make alloplastic implants can be hydrolytically decomposed which "leads to a local acidulation of the tissue and causes an inflammatory reaction during absorption". There can be complications with the long term function of alloplastic implants, if implants are poorly engineered and inadequately fixated. Improper fixation and numerous biomechanical and mechanical factors can contribute to the fracture of alloplastic implants or prostheses, loosening of alloplastic implants and reduced or complete loss of osseointegration. Biomechanical overload from the use of bone as leverage, creating leverage force, can place enormous stress on the implant as well as the bone–implant interface.
