= Larry L. Hench =

American ceramic engineer (1938–2015)

- Born: November 21, 1938; Shelby, Ohio, U.S.
- Died: December 16, 2015 (aged 77); Fort Myers, Florida, U.S.
- Burial place: Forest Meadows Central Cemetery, Gainesville, Florida
- Occupation: Academic
- Known for: Inventor of Bioglass 45S5
- Title: Professor and chair
- Spouse: June Wilson

Academic background
- Education: Ohio State University College of Engineering, B.S. 1961 and Ph.D. 1964

Academic work
- Era: 1964 to 2015
- Discipline: Ceramic engineering
- Institutions: University of Florida; Imperial College London; Florida Institute of Technology

Larry L. Hench (November 21, 1938 – December 16, 2015) was an American ceramic engineer and academic. He was an emeritus professor at the University of Florida and chair of the Ceramic Materials Department at Imperial College London. Hench invented Bioglass 45S5, the first manmade substance that could bond with living tissue.

== Early life ==
Hench was born on November 21, 1938, in Shelby, Ohio. His parents were Mary Elizabeth and Clarence Van Hench, a farmer. He grew up on the family farm in Tiro, Ohio. He attended primary school in Shelby and graduated from Tiro High School.

Hench graduated from Ohio State University in 1961 with a B.S. in ceramics engineering. While there, he was a member of Keramos, a professional fraternity for ceramic engineering, and Texnikoi, an engineering honor society. He also received a Ph.D. in ceramics engineering from Ohio State University in 1964.

== Career ==
In 1964, Hench was a research engineer at the Battelle Memorial Institute in Columbus, Ohio.Hench started his academic career as an assistant professor at the University of Florida in 1964, becoming an associate professor in 1968 and head professor of the ceramics division in 1970. Hench was a professor of materials science and engineering at the University of Florida for 32 years. In 1969, he invented Bioglass 45S5, the first manmade substance that could bond with living tissue. In the 1980s and 1990s, he received 32 patents and numerous approvals from the Food and Drug Administration. Twelve companies originated in Hench's laboratory, including the US Biomaterials Corp. and NovaBone Products LLC. Hench retired as a professor emeritus in 1996.

After he retired from the University of Florida, Hench became the chair of the Ceramics Materials Department at Imperial College London. While there, he co-founded the Tissue Engineering and Regenerative Medicine Centre with Julia Polak and served as its co-director for ten years.

Hench then helped start the Biomedical Engineering Department at the Florida Institute of Technology. He was the University Professor of Biomedical Engineering at the Florida Institute of Technology for three years, when he died. He was also the director of the Technology Center for Medical Materials and Photonics.

Hench published 30 books and more than 800 research papers. He also wrote a series of children's books and STEM educational materials featuring Boing-Boing the Bionic Cat, published by the American Ceramic Society and Can of Worms Press. His contributions to materials research were featured on the Discovery UK series Future Now: Scientific Breakthroughs Shaping Our Lives.

Hench founded and was president of the Society for Biomaterials. He was a member of the Institute of Materials, the Society of Glass Technology, and the World Academy of Ceramics. Hench was a consultant for the United States Army, the National Science Foundation, the National Institutes of Health, and the Brazilian Ministry of Industry.

== Honors ==
Hench was a member of Alpha Sigma Mu, Sigma Gamma Epsilon, Sigma Xi, and Tau Beta Pi honor societies. Tau Beta Pi gave him its Eminent Engineer Taway in 1970. He received the Texnikoi Outstanding Alumni Award in 1972. In 1972, he received the PACE Award, recognizing the outstanding ceramic engineer of the year, from the National Institute of Ceramic Engineers.

Ohio State University presented Hench with its Outstanding Alumnus Award in 1972. The University of Florida gave Hench its Dow Outstanding Faculty Award in 1973 and the College of Engineering Outstanding Service Award in 1974. Hench received the Florida Blue Key Distinguished Professor Award in 1976.

Hench became a fellow, and later a Distinguished Life Member, in 1976 of the American Ceramic Society. The Society of Biomaterials presented Hench with its Clemson Award for Basic Research in 1977 and its Founders Award in 1998. He received the PPG Industries George W. Morey Award for his publications in 1980.

The Ohio State University College of Engineering presented Hench with its Benjamin G. Lamme Meritorious Achievement Medal in 1999. In 2000, he was elected to the National Academy of Engineering. In 2007, the Ohio State University Alumni Association gave Hench its Professional Achievement Award.

Imperial College London established the Larry Hench Award in 2011 to recognize the best Ph.D. in biomaterials and tissue engineering. He received the 2014 Acta Biomaterialia Gold Medal Award, recognizing his lifetime of research excellence. He also received an honorary doctorate of engineering from the Rose–Hulman Institute of Technology.

== Personal life ==
Hench married Suzanne Hench; they had a son, Steven Hench. He then married June Wilson. Hench and Wilson co-wrote several textbooks. In 2008, he created the June Wilson Memorial Award through the London Materials Society to commemorate his wife's accomplishments in biomedical materials research. They had one son, Alan Hench, and stepchildren Martin Wilson and Joanna Wilson. After Wilson's death, Margaret Saunders was Hench's companion.

In 1971, Hench formed a Keramos fraternity chapter at the University of Florida.

Hench died at his home in Fort Myers, Florida, on December 16, 2015, at the age of 77. He was buried in the Forest Meadows Central Cemetery in Gainesville, Florida.

== Selected publications ==
=== Books ===
- Advances in the Nucleation and Crystallization in Glasses. with S. W. Frieman, co-editor.
- A Biography of Bioglass. London: Imperial College Press, 2015. ISBN 978-1848166790.

=== Books edited with June Wilson ===
- An Introduction to Bioceramics. Singapore: World Scientific Publishing Company, 1993. ISBN 9789810214005.
- Bioceramics: Proceedings of the 8th International Symposium on Ceramics in Medicine, Ponte Vedra, Florida. with David Greenspan, editor. Oxford: Pergamon Press, 1995. ISBN 9780080426778.
- Clinical Performance of Skeletal Prostheses. Springer Dordrecht, 1996. ISBN 978-0-412-72110-6.
