= Osteostimulation =

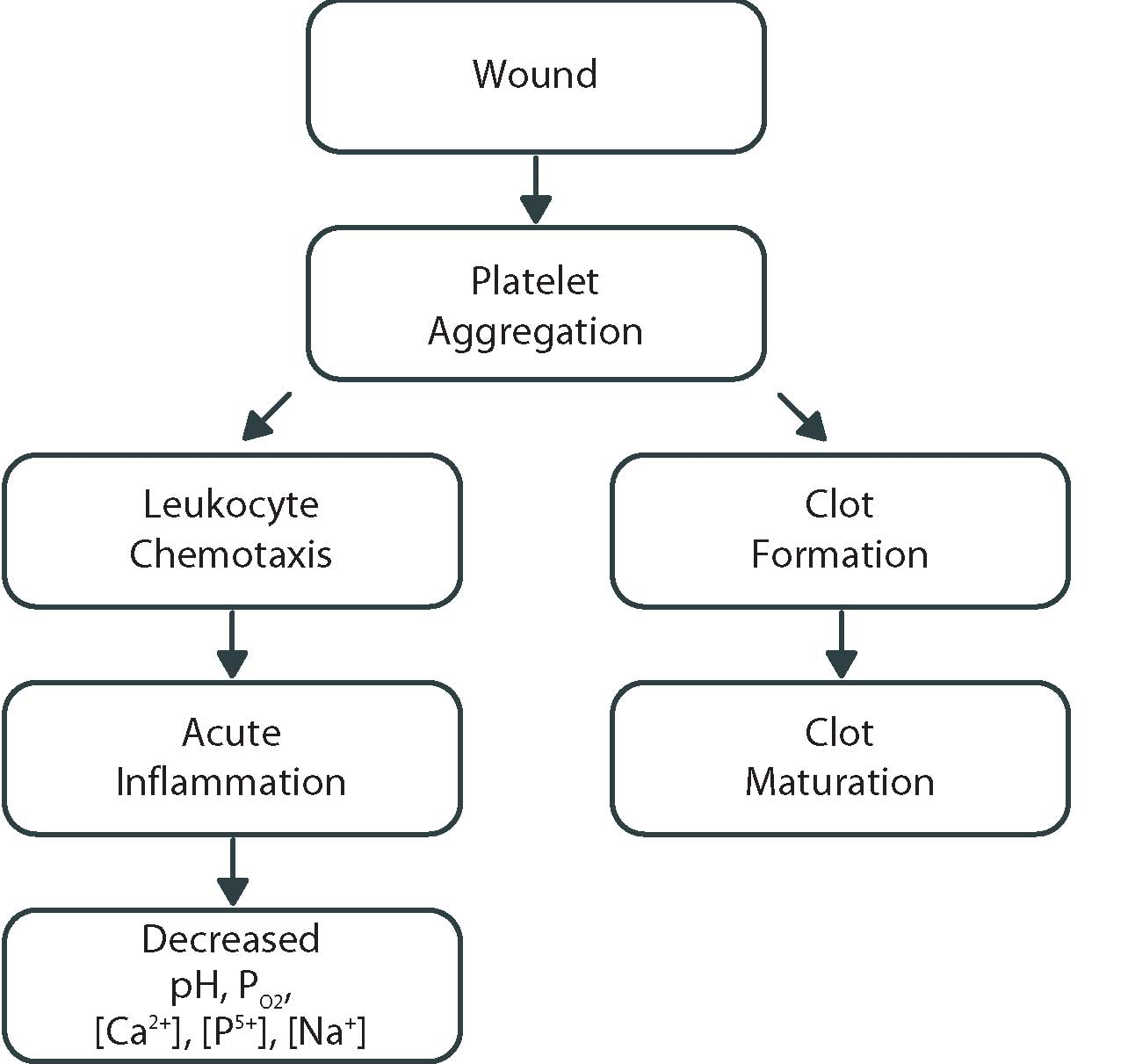

Osteostimulation is a technique attempted for improving healing of bone injuries or defects. It has not however been found to be significantly effective in increasing bone healing.

It is believed to work through the active stimulation of osteoblast proliferation and differentiation as evidenced by increased levels of DNA synthesis and of the osteoblast markers osteocalcin and alkaline phosphatase. Through an ionic exchange, Bioglass first acts as a scaffolding around and through which new bone forms. In vivo studies have demonstrated that the osteostimulative properties result in stimulation and acceleration of new bone formation in an osseous defect.

Osseous defects, whether from trauma or surgical intervention, all follow a similar healing pattern. Within minutes of defect formation, platelets collect at the site of the injury and adhere to the exposed collagen fibers. The release of the platelet contents stimulates additional platelet aggregation and initiates clot formation.^{1} This release also has a chemotactic effect and attracts various white blood cells (leukocytes) to the damaged tissues and an acute inflammatory response is initiated. Neutrophils and other leukocytes begin removing any bacteria, foreign material, and dead tissue via a process known as phagocytosis. The inflammatory response and other antigens in the wound also attract lymphocytes. These immune cells release cytokines, such as IL-1 and TNF-α, which can have multiple actions on further physiologic responses. For example, IL-1 amplifies the immune response by inducing the proliferation of T-cells, increases the phagocytic abilities of monocytes and macrophages, and induces the proliferation of fibroblasts. The disruption of the vascular supply, and the subsequent cellular reactions during the inflammatory and immune reactions, result in multiple changes in the local environment, including decreases in pH, oxygen content and the ionic concentrations for calcium, phosphorus, potassium and sodium. If these conditions persist, a chronic inflammatory response may set in, resulting in extensive tissue destruction.^{2} With respect to implant materials, chronic inflammation and foreign body reactions are associated with the development of a fibrous capsule around the implant. The goal of a graft material is to aid in tissue healing.

By moderating pH and ionic concentration changes^{3}, Bioglass may reduce the release or attraction of the immune cells, decreasing the time course and extent of the inflammatory response. Indirect evidence for this has been seen in recent research showing decreased TNF-α^{4} and elastase^{5} levels in the presence of Bioglass when compared to controls.

== Osteostimulation and pH ==
While normal tissue pH is 7.4-7.6, the inflammatory response can reduce local pH to 5.5 or lower due to the damaged vasculature and the release of various enzymes during phagocytosis.^{2} This acidic pH is itself damaging to the surrounding tissues and, by stimulating new inflammatory reactions, acts to prolong the healing process.^{1} Conversely, in vitro testing of Bioglass has shown an increase in local pH around the graft material.^{3}Clinical evaluations in oral and periodontal defects have demonstrated a reduced level of tissue inflammation over defects grafted with Bioglass.^{6} This may be attributed in part to the partial neutralization of the acidic pH changes normally seen during the inflammatory process.

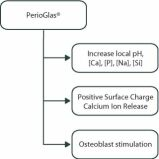

== Osteostimulation and hemostasis ==
Bioglass has been shown to be hemostatic, decreasing clotting time in lab tests by 25% when compared to controls.^{7} While the actual origin of this effect has not yet being ascertained, two potential hypothesis are the development of a positive surface charge that forms on the Bioglass after implantation and the release of calcium ions during material dissolution. A positive surface charge has been shown to encourage clotting in a number of models. In addition, calcium ions are required during several steps in both the intrinsic and extrinsic clotting pathways, and are also involved in maturation of the fibrin network developed during clotting.^{1} The continued physical presence of the Bioglass particles and its prolonged release of calcium ions may act to stabilize the formed clot or callus to encourage more rapid site vascularization and provide an active scaffold for tissue repair.

== Stimulation and recruitment of osteoblasts ==
The presence and recruitment of osteoblasts, the “bone-forming” cells, are required for bone healing. Within 24 hours of implantation, in vitro testing has shown that the calcium and phosphorus ions released from the Bioglass precipitate back onto the particles as a calcium phosphate surface layer.^{3} This layer is similar to normal bone mineral, creating a surface that is more favorable to osteoblast attachment than other synthetic materials.^{8} Cultures with human primary osteoblasts have shown that bioactive glass stimulates the proliferation and differentiation of osteoblasts^{9}, with calcified bone nodule formation on the material surfaces being observed as early as six days. Additionally, these same investigators also have demonstrated that the ionic species released during the dissolution of Bioglass have a similar effect by increasing osteoblast proliferation.^{10} Bioglass particles therefore form a three-dimensional porous scaffold with surfaces that stimulate osteoblast proliferation and attachment and bone formation.
