= Hepatoma-derived growth factor =

Protein capable of worsening malignant diseases

HDGF

Identifiers
- Aliases: HDGF, HMG1L2, hepatoma-derived growth factor, heparin binding growth factor
- External IDs: OMIM: 600339; MGI: 1194494; GeneCards: HDGF
Available structures
PDB	Ortholog search: PDBe RCSB
PDB	List of PDB id codes 1RI0, 2NLU

Gene location (Human)
Chr.	Chromosome 1 (human)
Band	1q23.1	Start	156,742,109 bp
Band	1q23.1	End	156,766,925 bp

Gene location (Mouse)
Chr.	Chromosome 3 (mouse)
Band	3 F1|3 38.78 cM	Start	87,813,628 bp
Band	3 F1|3 38.78 cM	End	87,823,439 bp
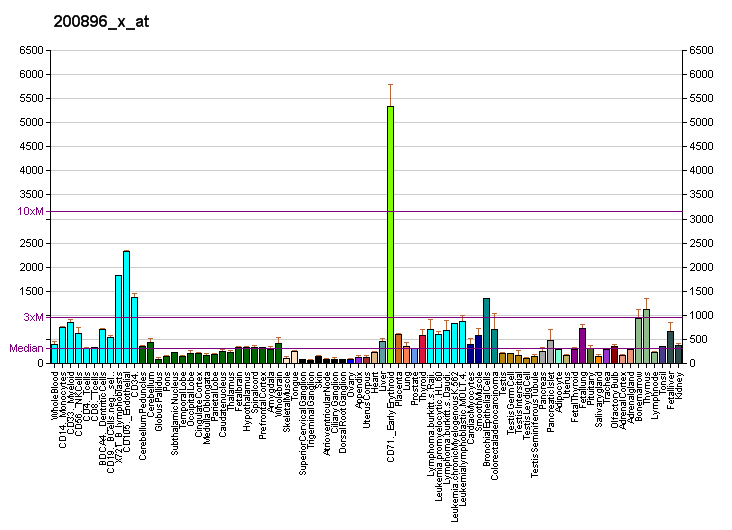

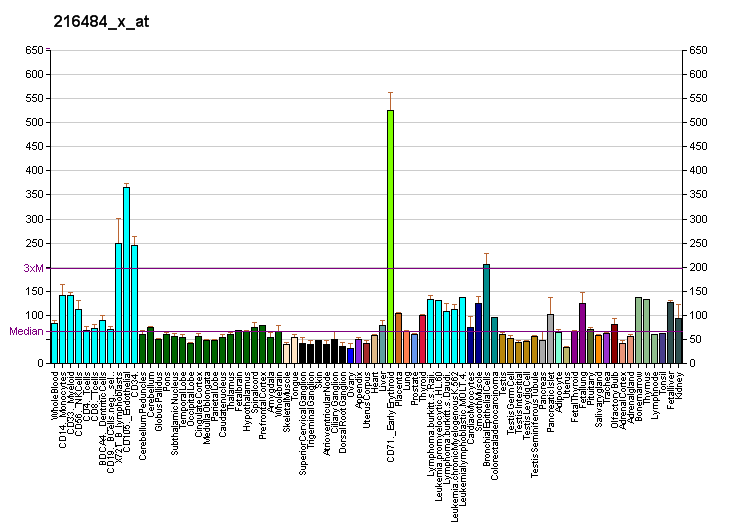
RNA expression pattern
Bgee	Human / Mouse (ortholog); Top expressed in: ventricular zone; ganglionic eminence; mucosa of ileum; olfactory zone of nasal mucosa; mucosa of transverse colon; right uterine tube; rectum; skin of leg; gastrocnemius muscle; skin of abdomen / Top expressed in: otic placode; otic vesicle; saccule; Ileal epithelium; fetal liver hematopoietic progenitor cell; epiblast; lactiferous gland; ventricular zone; lip; yolk sac; More reference expression data
BioGPS	More reference expression data
Gene ontology
Molecular function	nucleotide binding; DNA binding; transcription corepressor binding; transcription corepressor activity; growth factor activity; heparin binding; RNA binding
Cellular component	cytoplasm; transcription repressor complex; nucleus; nucleoplasm; extracellular space; extracellular matrix; extracellular region; collagen-containing extracellular matrix
Biological process	IRE1-mediated unfolded protein response; cell population proliferation; regulation of transcription, DNA-templated; negative regulation of transcription by RNA polymerase II; transcription, DNA-templated; signal transduction; cellular process or phenomenon; regulation of signaling receptor activity; cellular response to interleukin-7
Sources:Amigo / QuickGO
Orthologs
Databases	NCBI: entry; OMA: entry
Species	Human	Mouse
Entrez	3068	15191
Ensembl	ENSG00000143321	ENSMUSG00000004897
UniProt	P51858	P51859
RefSeq (mRNA)	NM_001126050; NM_001126051; NM_004494; NM_001319186; NM_001319187 NM_001319188	NM_008231; NM_001331051; NM_001331052
RefSeq (protein)	NP_001119522; NP_001119523; NP_001306115; NP_001306116; NP_001306117 NP_004485	NP_001317980; NP_001317981; NP_032257
Location (UCSC)	Chr 1: 156.74 – 156.77 Mb	Chr 3: 87.81 – 87.82 Mb
PubMed search
- Wikidata
View/Edit Human	View/Edit Mouse

Hepatoma-derived growth factor (HDGF) also known as high mobility group protein 1-like 2 (HMG-1L2) is a protein that in humans is encoded by the HDGF gene.
