= Bone growth factor =

Factor that stimulates the growth of bone tissue

A bone growth factor is a growth factor that stimulates the growth of bone tissue.

Known bone growth factors include insulin-like growth factor-1 (IGF-1), insulin-like growth factor-2 (IGF-2), transforming growth factor beta (TGF-β), fibroblast growth factors (FGFs), platelet-derived growth factor (PDGF), parathyroid hormone-related peptide (PTHrP), bone morphogenetic proteins (BMPs), and certain members of the growth differentiation factor (GDF) group of proteins.

The ultimate target of bone growth factors are osteoblasts, osteoclasts and fibroblasts. Human fibroblasts and osteoblasts were shown to be capable of producing bone growth factors after stimulation.

Major hormones influencing bone growth and morphology include growth hormone (GH), androgens such as testosterone and dihydrotestosterone, and estrogens such as estradiol.

== Types ==
=== Transforming growth factor beta ===
Transforming growth factor beta (TGF-β) is a physiological regulator of osteoblast differentiation, and acts as a central component in the coupling of bone formation and its resorption during bone remodeling.

=== Bone morphogenetic proteins ===
Bone morphogenetic proteins (BMPs) are proteins that are made of acidic polypeptides and belongs to the TGF-B family. BMPs promote the regeneration of bone tissue and cartilage. BMP exhibits osteoinductive activity. Osteoinductive activity leads to bone formation, activates mesenchymal cells to transform into osteoblasts which ultimately yield bone formation. BMP targets and binds to mesenchymal cells and activates a transmembrane serine/threonine kinase receptor which will lead to the phosphorylation of molecules called SMADS. SMADS are transcription factors that will induce osteoblast growth.

=== Platelet derived growth factor ===
The majority of the substrates of platelet-derived growth factor (PDGF) exhibit similar structures to Src Homology 2 domain. These substrates will bind to the PDGFR receptors which will dimerize and autophosphorylate. This phosphorylation attracted PLC-gamma (induces cell proliferation), Ras (which goes through signaling cascade and acts as a transcription factor), phosphatidylinositol 3-kinase (PI3K) which also promotes a signaling cascade inducing transcription factors, and stress fiber formation, and induces the STAT pathway which activates transcription factors.

=== Fibroblast growth factor ===
Platelet-derived growth factors (PDGFs) are polypeptides found in various tissues, including bone, where it was originally postulated that it could act as an autologous regulator of bone remodeling. This protein has been initially isolated in human platelets, and is composed of two different polypeptide chains A and B. The combination of these polypeptides form the homodimeric (AA) or (BB), or heterodimeric (AB) chains of PDGF. Fibroblast growth factor (FGF) signaling cascade is started by the binding of 2 growth factors to the FGFR. Dimerization takes place and initiates the transphosphorylation of each receptor. These phosphorylation sites act as docking sites for proteins so they may induce downstream signaling. These proteins consist of FRS2-alpha and PLC-gamma. FRS2-alpha acts as a scaffold protein to hold GAB1 and GRB2 which then proteins bind to SHP2 and SOS. These several proteins act together to activates the Ras pathway (induces cell proliferation and differentiation) and the PI3K pathway (induces survival and cell fate determination). On the other side of the dimerized receptors, PLC-gamma activates DAG and IP3 which yield PKC and calcium ions. PKC and calcium will ultimately induce morphology, migration, and adhesion.

=== Insulin-like growth factors ===
Insulin-like growth factors (IGF) assist bone growth in the body. IGF's are single-chain polypeptides that are similarly structured to insulin. There are 2 IGFs: Insulin-like growth factor 1 (IGF-1), and Insulin-like growth factor 2 (IGF-2). IGF-1 is induced by growth hormone (GH), and targets cartilage, stimulating cell bone cell proliferation. Studies carried out by Yakar S, Rosen CJ have shown in animal models that IGF-1 can enhance longitudinal growth, periosteal circumference, and bone mineral density. IGF-1 is responsible for increasing overall body size, longitudinal bone size, and height, especially during puberty.

=== Parathyroid hormone-related protein ===
Parathyroid hormone-related protein (PTHrP) is important for endochondral bone formation. Martin (2005) found that PTHrP stimulates bone formation by increasing osteoblast differentiation and reducing osteoblast apoptosis. This causes an increase in osteoblasts allowing for new bone cells to be formed. PTHrP also regulates osteoclast formation, further allowing for bone growth.

== Hormones ==
Estrogens cause the hips to widen and become rounded during puberty in females, and androgens cause the shoulders to broaden in males. Estrogens mediate epiphyseal closure in both males and females. Other hormones implicated in control of bone growth include thyroid hormone, parathyroid hormone, calcitonin, glucocorticoids such as cortisol, and vitamin D (calcitriol). According to menoPAUSE, a blog from University of Rochester, estrogen causes females to have their fat distributed in their breasts, thighs, and along their pelvic area, implying that the fat can be used as an energy source for future pregnancies. For men, androgens (such as testosterone) increases male's muscle-to-fat ratio.Woods J. "What does Estrogen Have to Do with Belly Fat?".

== Clinical significance ==
=== Potential treatment for osteoporosis ===
Osteoporosis is a bone disease where bone mass is less than the average and can increase fractures. Some causes that lead to osteoporosis is how old you are, and decreasing amount of estrogen, which is why it mainly occurs in older women (however it can also impact men as well).

During a recent study performed at Children's Medical Center Research Institute at UT Southwestern, Bone Growth Factor Osteolectin (Clec11a) has also shown regenerative properties. Ovaries were removed from mice to simulate osteoporosis of post menopausal women. Results were based on daily injections of Osteolectin to determine the effects. This research showed an increase in bone volume of mice with bone loss after their ovaries were removed.

To be more specific, in order to help people with osteoporosis, medication is used along with treating bone fractures. Clec11a is a glycoprotein that bone marrow expresses which Elifesciences states.

=== Tendon treatment ===
Several studies have shown a correlation between the administration of bone growth factors and the amelioration of the tendon-to-bone healing. The focus of these studies was primarily on the anterior cruciate ligament (ACL) located in the knee, due to the high number of injuries sustained by athletes. The University of Dammam, King Fahd Hospital in Saudi Arabia was able to show that the addition of SHMSP bone growth factor via powder facilitated the process of tendon-graft healing in rabbits. Comparison of this SHMSP test group to the control group illustrated a higher level of formation and organization within the knee.

The Hospital for Special Surgery in New York conducted a similar study, in which a collagen sponge containing bone protein was implanted in the ACL of rabbits. In this case, the bone protein isolated from bovine femurs contained several bone morphogenetic proteins, which are part of an important signaling system that aides in the structure of bones. As with the application of SHMSP, the inclusion of bone protein in the collagen sponge was seen to improve the healing process, when compared to control groups with the sponge alone or no sponge.

In a separate study also implemented by the Hospital for Special Surgery as well as the University of California, treatment of the anterior cruciate ligament utilized the recombinant human bone morphogenic protein rhBMP-2 in two phases. In phase one, the dosages of noggin, a regulator protein, as well as rhBMP-2 were properly calibrated, and in phase two these proteins carried on synthetic calcium phosphate matrix (CPM) were then injected into the ACL region. The results of this procedure also demonstrated an improvement in the collagen fiber formation between the tendon and the bone.

Hence, all three treatments were seen to improve the efficacy of tendon-to-bone healing via the different bone growth factors: SHMSP, bone protein, and rhBMP-2.
