= Synthesis of bioglass =

Bioactive glasses have been synthesized through methods such as conventional melting, quenching, the sol–gel process, flame synthesis, and microwave irradiation. The synthesis of bioglass has been reviewed by various groups, with sol-gel synthesis being one of the most frequently used methods for producing bioglass composites, particularly for tissue engineering applications. Other methods of bioglass synthesis have been developed, such as flame and microwave synthesis, though they are less prevalent in research.

== History and methodology ==
=== Melt quench synthesis ===
The first bioactive glass, developed by Larry Hench in 1969, was produced by melting a mixture of related oxide precursors at relatively high temperatures. This original bioactive glass, named Bioglass, was melt-derived with a composition of 46.1 mol% SiO_{2}, 24.4 mol% Na_{2}O, 26.9 mol% CaO, and 2.6 mol% P_{2}O_{5}. The selection of glass composition for specific applications is often based on a comprehensive understanding of how each major component influences the properties of the glass, considering both its final use and its manufacturing process. Despite extensive research over the past 40 years, only a limited number of glass compositions have been approved for clinical use. Among these, the two melt-derived compositions approved by the U.S. Food and Drug Administration (FDA)—45S5 and S53P4—consist of four oxides: SiO_{2}, Na_{2}O, CaO, and P_{2}O_{5}. In general, a large number of elements can be dissolved in glasses. The effect of Al_{2}O_{3}, B_{2}O_{3}, Fe_{2}O_{3}, MgO, SrO, BaO, ZnO, Li_{2}O, K_{2}O, CaF_{2} and TiO_{2} on the in vitro or in vivo properties of certain compositions of bioactive glasses has been reported. However, the influence of composition on the properties and compatibility of bioactive and biodegradable glasses is not fully understood.

Scaffolds fabricated by the melt quench technique have much less porosity, which causes issues with healing and tissue integration during in-vivo testing.

=== Sol–gel process ===
The sol–gel process has a long history in the synthesis of silicate systems and other oxides and has become a widely researched field with significant technological relevance. This process is used for the fabrication of thin films, coatings, nanoparticles, and fibers. Sol-gel processing technology at low temperatures, an alternative to traditional melt processing of glasses, involves the synthesis of a solution (sol), typically composed of metal-organic and metal salt precursors. This is followed by the formation of a gel through chemical reaction or aggregation, and finally, thermal treatment for drying, organic removal, and sometimes crystallization and cooling treatment. The synthesis of specific silicate bioactive glasses using the sol–gel technique at low temperatures, employing metal alkoxides as precursors, was demonstrated in 1991 by Li et al. Typical precursors for bioactive glass synthesis include tetraethyl orthosilicate, calcium nitrate and triethyl phosphate. Following hydrolysis and poly-condensation reactions, a gel is formed, which is then calcined at 600–700°C to form the glass. Sol–gel derived products, such as thin films or particles, are highly porous and exhibit a high specific surface area. Recent research by Hong et al. has focused on fabricating bioactive silicate glass nanoparticles through a combination of the sol–gel route and the co-precipitation method. In this process, the mixture of precursors is hydrolyzed in an acidic environment, condensed in an alkaline condition, and then subjected to freeze-drying. The morphology and size of bioactive glass nanoparticles can be tailored by varying the production conditions and the feeding ratio of reagents.

Different ions can be incorporated into bioactive glasses, including zinc, magnesium, zirconium, titanium, boron and silver, to enhance functionality and bioactivity. However, synthesizing bioactive glasses at the nanoscale with these ions can be challenging. Recently, Delben et al. developed sol–gel-derived bioactive glass doped with silver, reporting that the Si–O–Si bond number increased with higher silver concentrations, resulting in structural densification. It was also observed that quartz and metallic silver crystallization increased with higher silver content, while hydroxyapatite crystallization decreased.

The sol–gel technique is widely regarded for its versatility in synthesizing inorganic materials and has proven suitable for producing various bioactive glasses. However, it is limited in the range of compositions that can be produced. Residual water or solvent content may complicate its application in biomedical fields, necessitating high-temperature calcination to eliminate organic remnants. Additionally, sol–gel processing is time-consuming and, being a batch process, can result in batch-to-batch variations.

=== Other methods ===
Beginning in 2006, researchers have produced alternate methods of synthesizing bioglass; these methods include flame synthesis and microwave synthesis. Flame synthesis works by baking the powders directly in a flame reactor. Microwave synthesis is a rapid and low-cost method where precursors are dissolved in water, transferred to an ultrasonic bath, and then irradiated.
