= Bioglass 45S5 =

Bioactive glass biomaterial

Molecular structure of Bioglass

Bioglass 45S5 or calcium sodium phosphosilicate, is a bioactive glass specifically composed of 45 wt% SiO_{2}, 24.5 wt% CaO, 24.5 wt% Na_{2}O, and 6.0 wt% P_{2}O_{5}. Typical applications of Bioglass 45S5 include: bone grafting biomaterials, repair of periodontal defects, cranial and maxillofacial repair, wound care, blood loss control, stimulation of vascular regeneration, and nerve repair.

The name "Bioglass" was trademarked by the University of Florida as a name for the original 45S5 composition. It should therefore only be used in reference to the 45S5 composition and not as a general term for bioactive glasses. Bioglass 45S5 is available commercially under the registered trade name NovaMin, which is owned by the pharmaceutical company GlaxoSmithKline. NovaMin is bioactive glass that has been ground into a fine particulate with a median size of less than 20 μm. It can reduce dentin hypersensitivity by blocking open dentinal tubules and by supplying calcium (Ca^{2+}) and phosphate (PO^{3−}_{4}) ions to form hydroxycarbonate apatite (HCA), the principal mineral component of bone tissue in mammals. NovaMin is the active ingredient in Sensodyne "Repair & Protect" toothpaste, except when sold in the United States, containing stannous fluoride instead.

== Characteristics ==
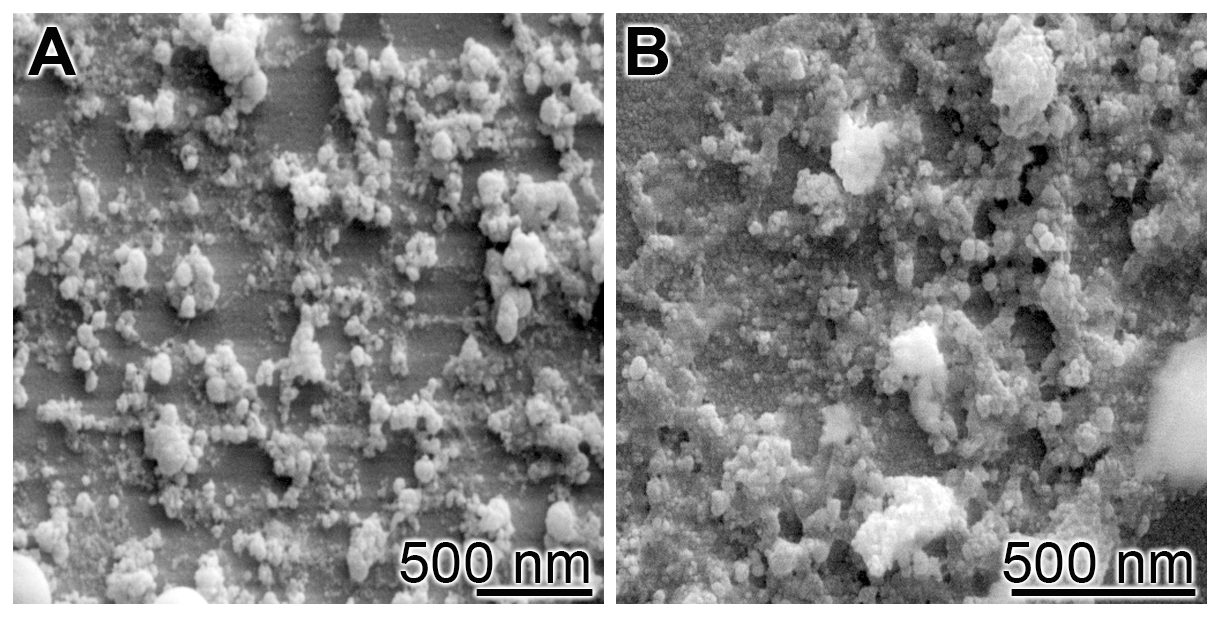
The morphology of Bioglass using SEM, sintered at 900 °C

45S5 bioactive glass is white in color and is in powder form, with particulates with a median size of less than 20 μm. Its chemical composition by weight is: silica (SiO_{2}) 43–47%, calcium oxide (CaO) 22.5–26.5%, phosphorus pentoxide (P_{2}O_{5}) 5–7% and sodium oxide (Na_{2}O) 22.5–26.5%.

Glasses are non-crystalline disordered solids that are commonly composed of silica-based materials with other minor additives. Compared to soda–lime glass (commonly used, as in windows or bottles), Bioglass 45S5 contains less silica and higher amounts of calcium and phosphorus. The 45S5 name signifies glass with 45% by weight of SiO_{2} and 5:1 molar ratio of calcium to phosphorus. This high ratio of calcium to phosphorus promotes formation of apatite crystals; calcium and silica ions can act as crystallization nuclei. Lower Ca:P ratios do not bond to bone. Bioglass 45S5's specific composition is optimal in biomedical applications because of its similar composition to that of hydroxyapatite, the mineral component of bone. This similarity provides Bioglass 45S5's ability to be integrated with living bone.

This composition of bioactive glass is mechanically soft in comparison to other glasses. It can be machined, preferably with diamond tools, or ground to powder. Bioglass 45S5 has to be stored in a dry environment, as it readily absorbs moisture and reacts with it. Bioglass 45S5 is the first formulation of an artificial material that was found to chemically bond with bone, and its discovery led to a series of other bioactive glasses. One of its main medical advantages is its biocompatibility, seen in its ability to avoid an immune reaction and fibrous encapsulation. Its primary application is the repair of bone injuries or defects too large to be regenerated by the natural process.

== History ==
Bioglass 45S5 is important to the field of biomimetic materials as one of the first completely synthetic materials that seamlessly bonds to bone. It was developed by Larry L. Hench in the late 1960s. The idea for the material came to him during a bus ride in 1967. While working as an assistant professor at the University of Florida, Hench decided to attend the U.S. Army Materials Research Conference held in Sagamore, New York, where he planned to talk about radiation resistant electronic materials. He began discussing his research with a fellow traveller on the bus, Colonel Klinker, who had recently returned to the United States after serving as an Army medical supply officer in Vietnam.

After listening to Hench's description of his research, the Colonel asked, "If you can make a material that will survive exposure to high energy radiation can you make a material that will survive exposure to the human body?" Klinker then went on to describe the amputations that he had witnessed in Vietnam, which resulted from the body's rejection of metal and plastic implants. Hench realized that there was a need for a novel material that could form a living bond with tissues in the body.

When Hench returned to Florida after the conference, he submitted a proposal to the U.S. Army Medical Research and Design Command. He received funding in 1968, and in November 1969 Hench began to synthesize small rectangles of what he called 45S5 glass. Ted Greenlee, Assistant Professor of Orthopaedic Surgery at the University of Florida, implanted them in rat femurs at the VA Hospital in Gainesville. Six weeks later, Greenlee called Hench asking, "Larry, what are those samples you gave me? They will not come out of the bone. I have pulled on them, I have pushed on them, I have cracked the bone and they are still bonded in place."

With this first successful experiment, Bioglass was born and the first compositions studied. Hench published his first paper on the subject in 1971 in the Journal of Biomedical Materials Research, and his lab continued to work on the project for the next 10 years with continued funding from the U.S. Army. By 2006, there were over 500 papers published on the topic of bioactive glasses from different laboratories and institutions around the world. The first successful surgical use of Bioglass 45S5 was in replacement of ossicles in the middle ear as a treatment of conductive hearing loss, and the material continues to be used in bone reconstruction applications today.

Other uses include cones for implantation into the jaw following a tooth extraction. Composite materials made of Bioglass 45S5 and patient's own bone can be used for bone reconstruction. Further research is being conducted for the development of new processing techniques to allow for more applications of Bioglass.

== Applications ==
Bioglass 45S5 is used in jaw and orthopedics applications, in this way it dissolves and can stimulate the natural bone to repair itself. Bioactive glass offers good osteoconductivity and bioactivity, it can deliver cells and is biodegradable. This makes it an excellent candidate to be used in tissue engineering applications. Although this material is known to be brittle, it is still used extensively to enhance the growth of bone since new forms of bioactive glasses are based on borate and borosilicate compositions. Bioglass can also be doped with varying quantities of elements like copper, zinc, or strontium which can allow the growth and formation of healthy bone. The formation of neocartilage can also be induced with bioactive glass by using an in vitro culture of chondrocyte-seeded hydrogels and can serve as a subchondral substrate for tissue-engineered osteochondral constructs.

The borate-based bioactive glass has controllable degradation rates in order to match the rate at which actual bone is formed. Bone formation has been shown to enhance when using this type of material. When implanted into rabbit femurs, the 45S5 bioactive glass showed that it could induce bone proliferation at a much quicker rate than synthetic hydroxyapatite (HA). 45S5 glass can also be osteoconductive and osteoinductive because it allows for new bone growth along the bone-implant interface as well as within the bone-implant interface. Studies have been conducted to determine the process by which it can induce bone formation. It was shown that 45S5 glass degrades and releases sodium ions, as well as soluble silica, the combination of all these ions is said to produce new bone. Borate bioglass has proven that it can support cell proliferation and differentiation in vitro and in vivo. It also has shown that it is suitable to be used as a substrate for drug release when treating bone infection. However, there has been a concern as to whether or not the release of boron into a solution as borate ions will be toxic to the body. It has been shown that in static cell culture conditions, borate glasses were toxic to cells, but not in dynamic culture conditions.

Bioactive glass was applied to medical devices to help restore the hearing to a deaf patient using Bioglass 45S5 in 1984. The patient went deaf due to an ear infection that degraded two of the three bones in her middle ear. An implant was designed to replace the damaged bone and carry sound from the eardrum to the cochlea, restoring the patient's hearing. Before this material was available, plastics and metals would be used because they did not produce a reaction in the body; however, they eventually failed because tissue would grow around them after implantation. A prosthesis made up of Bioglass 45S5 was made to fit the patient and most of the prosthesis that were made were able to maintain functionality after 10 years. The Endosseous Ridge Maintenance Implant made of Bioglass 45S5 was another device that could be inserted into tooth extraction sites that would repair tooth roots and allow for a stable ridge for dentures.

Another area in which bioactive glass has been investigated to use is tooth enamel reconstruction, which has proven to be a difficult task in the field of dentistry. Enamel is made up of a very organized hierarchical microstructure of carbonated hydroxyapatite nanocrystals. It has been reported that Bioglass 45S5-phosphoric acid paste can be used to form an interaction layer that can obstruct dentinal tubule orifices and can therefore be useful in the treatment of dentin hypersensitivity lesions. This material in an aqueous environment could have an antibacterial property that is advantageous in periodontal surgical procedures. In a study done with 45S5 Bioglass, biofilms of Streptococcus sanguinis were grown on inactive glass particulates and the biofilm grown on the Bioglass was significantly lower than those that were on the inactive glass. It was concluded that Bioglass may reduce bacterial colonisation which could aid osseointegration. A highly effective antibacterial bioactive glass is S53P4, which has been reported to exhibit a high antimicrobial activity and did not seem to select for resistance in the microbial strains tested. Bioactive glasses that are sol-gel derived, such as CaPSiO and CaPSiO II, have also exhibited antibacterial properties. Studies done with S. epidermidis and E. coli cultured with bioactive glass have shown that the 45S5 bioactive glass have a very high antibacterial resistance. It was also observed in the experiment that there were needle-like bioglass debris which could have ruptured the cell walls of the bacteria and rendered them inactive.

GlaxoSmithKline is using this material as an active ingredient in toothpaste under the commercial name NovaMin, which can help repair tiny holes and decrease tooth sensitivity. More advanced fluoride-containing formulations of Bioglass have been developed, which provide stronger and longer-lasting protection against sensitivity. The inclusion of fluoride within the glass rather than as a soluble addition, such as the toothpaste BioMin, is claimed to optimise the rate of development of apatite, which shields the teeth from sensitivity for up to 12 hours.

== Mechanism of action ==
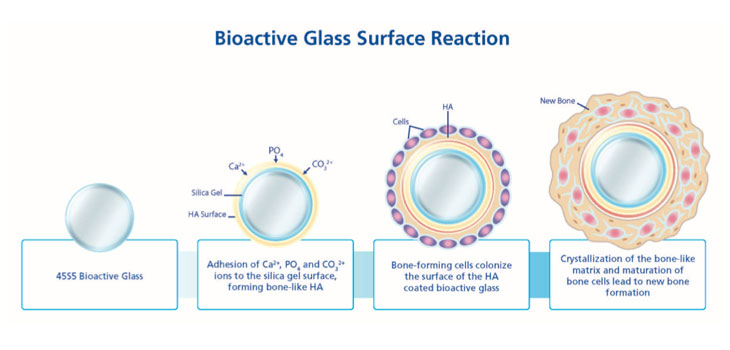
The integration of Bioglass with bone. The reaction with surrounding physiological fluid at the surface of Bioglass is shown in first two steps, and the formation of new bone is shown in the last two stages.

When implanted, Bioglass 45S5 reacts with the surrounding physiological fluid, causing the formation of a hydroxyl carbonated apatite (HCA) layer at the material surface. The HCA layer has a similar composition to hydroxyapatite, the mineral phase of bone, a quality which allows for strong interaction and integration with bone. The process by which this reaction occurs can be separated into 12 steps. The first 5 steps are related to the Bioglass response to the environment within the body, and occur rapidly at the material surface over several hours. Reaction steps 6–10 detail the reaction of the body to the integration of the biomaterial, and the process of integration with bone. These stages occur over the scale of several weeks or months. The steps are separated as follows:

1. Alkali ions (such as Na^{+} and Ca^{2+}) on the glass surface rapidly exchange with hydrogen ions or hydronium from surrounding bodily fluids. The reaction below shows this process, which causes hydrolysis of silica groups. As this occurs, the pH of the solution increases.
  Si⎯O⎯Na^{+} + H^{+} + OH^{−} → Si⎯OH^{+} + Na^{+} (aq) + OH^{−}
2. Due to an increase in the hydroxyl (OH^{−}) concentration at the surface (a result of step 1), a dissolution of the silica glass network occurs, seen by the breaking of Si⎯O⎯Si bonds. Soluble silica is transformed to the form of Si(OH)_{4} and silanols (Si⎯OH) creation occurs at the material surface. The reaction occurring in this stage is shown below:
  Si⎯O⎯Si + H_{2}O→ Si⎯OH + OH⎯Si
3. The silanol groups at the material surface condense and repolymerize to form a silica-gel layer at the surface of bioglass. As a result of the first steps, the surface contains very little alkali content. The condensation reaction is shown below:
  Si⎯OH + Si⎯OH → Si⎯O⎯Si
4. Amorphous Ca^{2+} and PO^{3−}_{4} gather at the silica-rich layer (created in step 3) from both the surrounding bodily fluid and the bulk of the Bioglass. This creates a layer composed primarily of CaO⎯P_{2}O_{5} on top of the silica layer.
5. The CaO⎯P_{2}O_{5} film created in step 4 incorporates OH^{−} and CO^{2−}_{3} from the bodily solution, causing it to crystallize. This layer is called a mixed carbonated hydroxyl apatite (HCA).
6. Growth factors adsorb (adsorption) to the surface of Bioglass due to its structural and chemical similarities to hydroxyapatite.
7. Adsorbed growth factors cause the activation of M2 macrophages. M2 macrophages tend to promote wound healing and initiate the migration of progenitor cells to an injury site. In contrast, M1 macrophages become activated when a non-biocompatible material is implanted, triggering an inflammatory response.
8. Triggered by M2 macrophage activation, mesenchymal stem cells and osteoprogenitor cells migrate to the Bioglass surface and attach to the HCA layer.
9. Stem cells and osteoprogenitor cells at the HCA surface differentiate to become osteogenic cells typically present in bone tissue, particularly osteoblasts.
10. The attached and differentiated osteoblasts generate and deposit extracellular matrix (ECM) components, primarily type I collagen, the main protein component of bone.
11. The collagen ECM becomes mineralized as normally occurs in native bone. Nanoscale hydroxyapatite crystals form a layered structure with the deposited collagen at the surface of the implant.
12. Following these reactions, bone growth continues as the newly recruited cells continue to function and facilitate tissue growth and repair. The Bioglass implant continues to degrade and be converted to new ECM material.

== Manufacturing ==
There are two main manufacturing techniques that are used for the synthesis of bioglass. The first is melt quench synthesis, which is the conventional glassmaking technology used by Larry Hench when he first manufactured the material in 1969. This method includes melting a mixture of oxides such as SiO_{2}, Na_{2}O, CaO and P_{2}O_{5} at high temperatures generally above 1100–1300 °C. Platinum or platinum alloy crucibles are used to avoid contamination, which would interfere with the product's chemical reactivity in organism. Annealing is a crucial step in forming bulk parts, due to high thermal expansion of the material. Heat treatment of Bioglass reduces the volatile alkali metal oxide content and precipitates apatite crystals in the glass matrix. However, the scaffolds that result from melt quench techniques are much less porous compared to other manufacturing methods, which may lead to defects in tissue integration when implanted in vivo.

The second method is sol-gel synthesis of Bioglass. This process is carried out at much lower temperatures than the traditional melting methods. It involves the creation of a solution (sol), which is composed of metal-organic and metal salt precursors. A gel is then formed through hydrolysis and condensation reactions, and it undergoes thermal treatment for drying, oxide formation, and organic removal. Because of the lower fabrication temperatures used in this method, there is a greater level of control on the composition and homogeneity of the product. In addition, sol-gel bioglasses have much higher porosity, which leads to a greater surface area and degree of integration in the body.

Newer methods include flame and microwave synthesis of Bioglass, which has been gaining attention in recent years. Flame synthesis works by baking the powders directly in a flame reactor. Microwave synthesis is a rapid and low-cost powder synthesis method in which precursors are dissolved in water, transferred to an ultrasonic bath, and irradiated.

== Shortcomings ==
A setback to using Bioglass 45S5 is that it is difficult to process into porous 3D scaffolds. These porous scaffolds are usually prepared by sintering glass particles that are already formed into the 3D geometry and allowing them to bond to the particles into a strong glass phase made up of a network of pores. Since this particular type of bioglass cannot fully sinter by viscous flow above its Tg, and its Tg is close to the onset of crystallization, it is hard to sinter this material into a dense network.

45S5 glass also has a slow degradation and rate of conversion to an HA-like material. This setback makes it more difficult for the degradation rate of the scaffold to coincide with the rate of tissue formation. Another limitation is that the biological environment can be easily influenced by its degradation. Increases in the sodium and calcium ions and changing pH is due to its degradation. However, the roles of these ions and their toxicity to the body have not been fully researched.

== Methods of improvement ==
Several studies have investigated methods to improve the mechanical strength and toughness of Bioglass 45S5. These include creating polymer–glass composites, which combine the bioactivity of Bioglass with the relative flexibility and wear resistance of different polymers. Another solution is coating a metallic implant with Bioglass, which takes advantage of the mechanical strength of the implant's bulk material while retaining bioactive effects at the surface. Some of the most notable modifications have used various forms of carbon to improve the properties of 45S5 glass.

For example, Touri et al. developed a method to incorporate carbon nanotubes (CNTs) into the structure without interfering with the material's bioactive properties. CNTs were chosen because of their large aspect ratio and high strength. By synthesizing Bioglass 45S5 on a CNT scaffold, the researchers were able to create a composite that more than doubled the compressive strength and the elastic modulus when compared to the pure glass.

Another study carried out by Li et al. looked into different properties, such as the fracture toughness and wear resistance of Bioglass 45S5. The authors loaded graphene nanoplatelets (GNP) into the glass structure through a spark plasma sintering method. Graphene was chosen because of its high specific surface area and strength, as well as its cytocompatibility and lack of interference with Bioglass 45S5's bioactivity. The composites that were created in this experiment achieved a fracture toughness of more than double the control. In addition, the tribological properties of the material were greatly improved.

== See also ==
- Larry L. Hench, head researcher
- Mechanical properties of biomaterials
- Synthesis of bioglass
