= Osteopromotive =

Class of compounds

Osteopromotive describes a material that promotes the de novo formation of bone.

Osteoconductivity describes the property of graft material in which it serves as a scaffold for new bone growth but does not induce bone growth de novo. This means that osteoconductive materials will only contribute to new bone growth in an area where there is already vital bone.

Osteoinductivity describes the property of graft material in which it induces de novo bone growth with biomimetic substances, such as bone morphogenetic proteins. Such materials will contribute to new bone growth in an area where there is no vital bone, such as when implanted into muscle tissue.

In contrast, osteopromotive substances will not contribute to de novo bone growth but serve to enhance the osteoinductivity of osteoinductive materials. An example of this is enamel matrix derivative, which serves to enhance the osteoinductive nature of demineralized freeze dried bone allograft (DFDBA).

== See also ==
- Bone growth factor
