= Osteoconduction =

Osteoconduction is the ability of a bone substitute material to encourage bone growth onto its surface.
