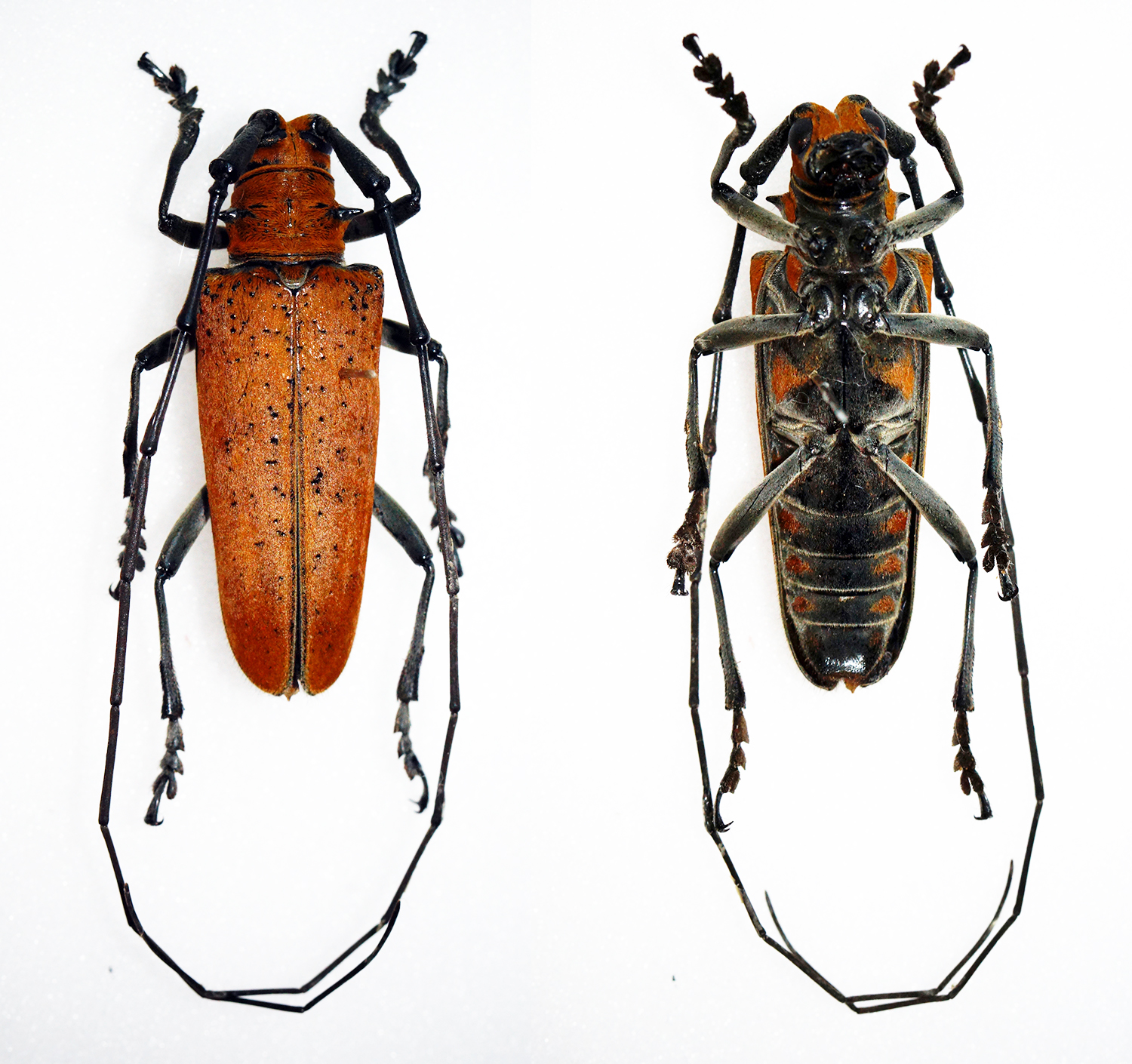
- Hammatoderus pollinosus

Scientific classification
- Kingdom: Animalia
- Phylum: Arthropoda
- Class: Insecta
- Order: Coleoptera
- Suborder: Polyphaga
- Infraorder: Cucujiformia
- Family: Cerambycidae
- Subfamily: Lamiinae
- Tribe: Lamiini
- Genus: Hammatoderus; Gemminger and Harold, 1873

Synonyms
- Hammoderus Dejean, 1835 (Nomen nudum); Hammoderus Thomson, 1860; Plagiohammus Dillon & Dillon, 1941

= Hammatoderus =

Genus of beetles

Hammatoderus is a genus of longhorn beetles of the subfamily Lamiinae. The genus is distributed in the Americas, from Mexico through Central America to South America south to Bolivia, Argentina, and Paraguay.

== Species ==
There are 28 recognized species:

- Hammatoderus albatus (Bates, 1880)
- Hammatoderus antonkozlovi Botero & Santos-Silva, 2017
- Hammatoderus brunneus (Dillon & Dillon, 1941)
- Hammatoderus colombiensis (Constantino, Benavides & Esteban-Durán, 2014)
- Hammatoderus confusor (Dillon & Dillon, 1941)
- Hammatoderus decorus (Chemsak & Linsley, 1986)
- Hammatoderus elatus (Bates, 1872)
- Hammatoderus emanon (Dillon & Dillon, 1941)
- Hammatoderus garciaorum Santos-Silva & Botero, 2018
- Hammatoderus granulosus (Bates, 1885)
- Hammatoderus inermis (Thomson, 1857)
- Hammatoderus juliae Botero & Santos-Silva, 2017
- Hammatoderus laceratus (Bates, 1885)
- Hammatoderus lacordairei (Thomson, 1860)
- Hammatoderus lingafelteri Botero & Santos-Silva, 2017
- Hammatoderus lunaris (Bates, 1880)
- Hammatoderus maculosus (Bates, 1880)
- Hammatoderus migueli Botero & Santos-Silva, 2017
- Hammatoderus nitidus (Bates, 1874)
- Hammatoderus olivescens (Dillon & Dillon, 1941)
- Hammatoderus ornator (Bates, 1885)
- Hammatoderus pollinosus (Bates, 1880)
- Hammatoderus rubefactus (Bates, 1872)
- Hammatoderus sallei (Thomson, 1860)
- Hammatoderus sticticus (Bates, 1874)
- Hammatoderus thiodes (Bates, 1880)
- Hammatoderus thoracicus (White, 1858)
- Hammatoderus wappesi Santos-Silva & Botero, 2018
