= Neoporus dimidiatus =

Scientific classification
- Domain: Eukaryota
- Kingdom: Animalia
- Phylum: Arthropoda
- Class: Insecta
- Order: Coleoptera
- Suborder: Adephaga
- Family: Dytiscidae
- Genus: Neoporus
- Species: N. dimidiatus

Binomial name
- Neoporus dimidiatus (Gemminger & Harold, 1868)

Synonyms
- Hydroporus dimidiatus Gemminger and Harold, 1868; Hydroporus semirufus LeConte, 1855; Hydroporus solitarius Sharp, 1882

Species of beetle

Neoporus dimidiatus is a species of predaceous diving beetle in the family Dytiscidae. It is found in North America.
