= Paregaploa =

Former species of beetle

Paregaploa conviva was a species of beetle in the family Carabidae, the sole species of the genus Paregaploa. It is now considered a synonym of Meroctenus crenulatus (Chaudoir, 1843).
