= Hammatoderus ornator =

Scientific classification
- Domain: Eukaryota
- Kingdom: Animalia
- Phylum: Arthropoda
- Class: Insecta
- Order: Coleoptera
- Suborder: Polyphaga
- Infraorder: Cucujiformia
- Family: Cerambycidae
- Tribe: Lamiini
- Genus: Hammatoderus
- Species: H. ornator

Binomial name
- Hammatoderus ornator (Bates, 1885)

Synonyms
- Hammoderus ornator Bates, 1885; Plagiohammus ornator (Bates, 1885)

Species of beetle

Hammatoderus ornator is a species of beetle in the family Cerambycidae. It was described by Henry Walter Bates in 1885. It is known to exist in Mexico.
