= Neoporus clypealis =

Scientific classification
- Kingdom: Animalia
- Phylum: Arthropoda
- Class: Insecta
- Order: Coleoptera
- Suborder: Adephaga
- Family: Dytiscidae
- Genus: Neoporus
- Species: N. clypealis

Binomial name
- Neoporus clypealis (Sharp, 1882)

Synonyms
- Hydroporus clypealis Sharp, 1882

Species of beetle

Neoporus clypealis is a species of predaceous diving beetle in the family Dytiscidae. It is found in North America.
