= Neoporus carolinus =

Scientific classification
- Kingdom: Animalia
- Phylum: Arthropoda
- Class: Insecta
- Order: Coleoptera
- Suborder: Adephaga
- Family: Dytiscidae
- Genus: Neoporus
- Species: N. carolinus

Binomial name
- Neoporus carolinus (Fall, 1917)

Synonyms
- Hydroporus carolinus Fall, 1917

Species of beetle

Neoporus carolinus is a species of predaceous diving beetle in the family Dytiscidae. It is found in North America.
