= Hammatoderus decorus =

Scientific classification
- Domain: Eukaryota
- Kingdom: Animalia
- Phylum: Arthropoda
- Class: Insecta
- Order: Coleoptera
- Suborder: Polyphaga
- Infraorder: Cucujiformia
- Family: Cerambycidae
- Tribe: Lamiini
- Genus: Hammatoderus
- Species: H. decorus

Binomial name
- Hammatoderus decorus (Chemsak & Linsley, 1986)

Synonyms
- Plagiohammus decorus Chemsak & Linsley, 1986

Species of beetle

Hammatoderus decorus is a species of beetle in the family Cerambycidae. It was described by Chemsak and Linsley in 1986. It is known from Mexico.
