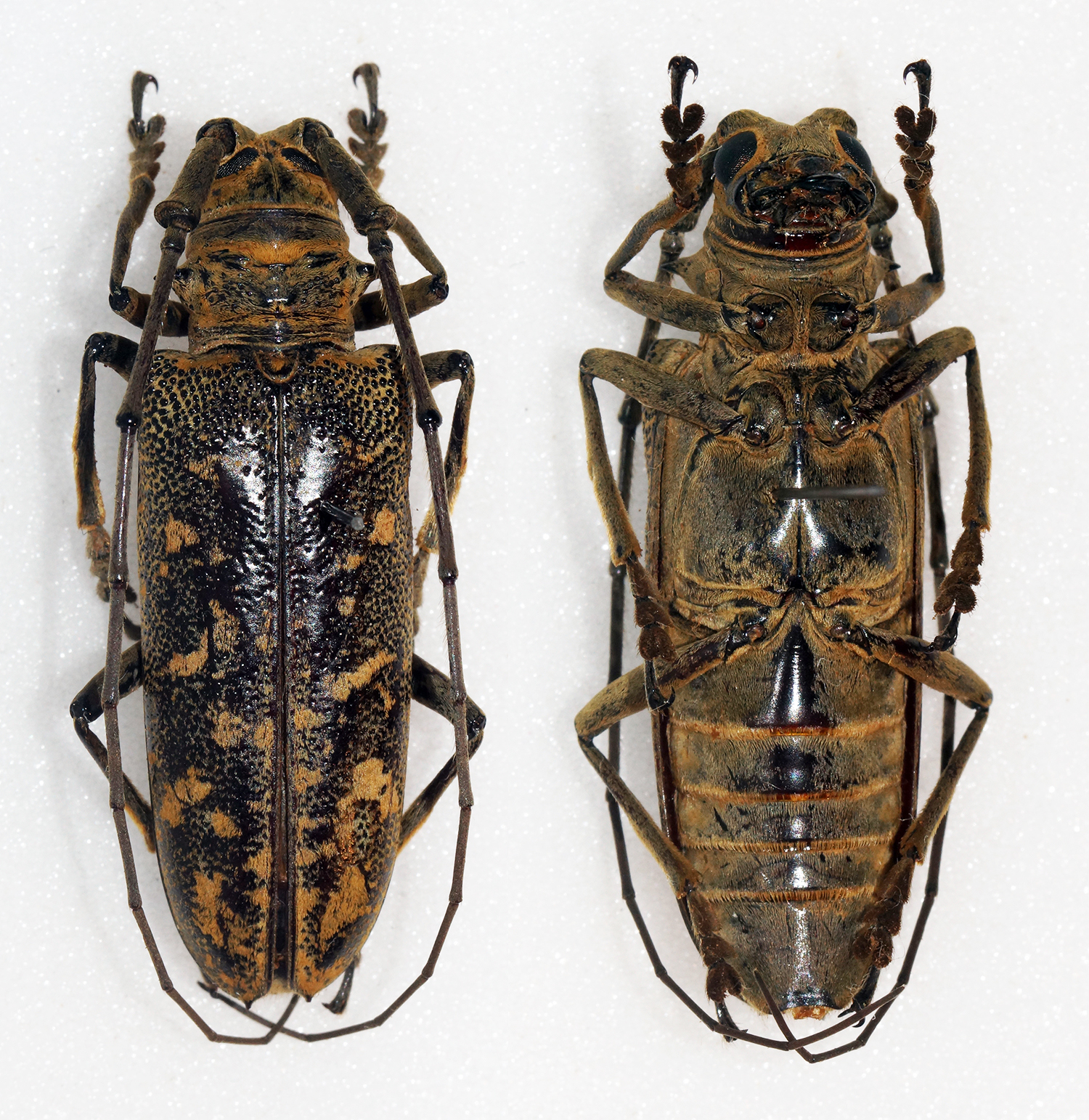

Scientific classification
- Domain: Eukaryota
- Kingdom: Animalia
- Phylum: Arthropoda
- Class: Insecta
- Order: Coleoptera
- Suborder: Polyphaga
- Infraorder: Cucujiformia
- Family: Cerambycidae
- Tribe: Lamiini
- Genus: Hammatoderus
- Species: H. rubefactus

Binomial name
- Hammatoderus rubefactus (Bates, 1872)

Synonyms
- Hammoderus rubefactus Bates, 1872; Plagiohammus rubefactus (Bates, 1872)

= Hammatoderus rubefactus =

Species of beetle

Hammatoderus rubefactus is a species of beetle in the family Cerambycidae. It was described by Henry Walter Bates in 1872. It is known from Nicaragua, Mexico, Costa Rica, and Panama.
