= Neoporus undulatus =

Scientific classification
- Domain: Eukaryota
- Kingdom: Animalia
- Phylum: Arthropoda
- Class: Insecta
- Order: Coleoptera
- Suborder: Adephaga
- Family: Dytiscidae
- Genus: Neoporus
- Species: N. undulatus

Binomial name
- Neoporus undulatus (Say, 1823)

Synonyms
- Hydroporus consimilus LeConte, 1850; Hydroporus undulatus Say, 1823

Species of beetle

Neoporus undulatus is a species of predaceous diving beetle in the family Dytiscidae. It is found in North America.
