= Scleral cartilage =

Cartilage found within the sclera of some vertebrate eyes

Details
- Precursor: Periocular mesenchyme
- System: Skeletal system

Identifiers
- Latin: 'Cartilago sclerae'

The scleral cartilage is a type of cartilage that develops within the sclera, the dense, fibrous outer layer of the vertebrate eye. It is found in many vertebrate groups, including birds, most other reptiles, teleost fishes, and cartilaginous fishes, but is absent in placental mammals and has been secondarily lost in groups like snakes.

The primary function of scleral cartilage is to provide structural rigidity to the eyeball. This helps maintain the eye's shape, supports the attachment of extraocular muscles, and in some species, aids in visual accommodation.

== Terminology ==
The term "scleral cartilage" has historically been used inconsistently in scientific literature, leading to confusion about the homology and evolution of different skeletal elements within the vertebrate eye. For example, the term has been used to describe any cartilage in the sclera, regardless of its developmental origin or evolutionary relationship to elements in other species. To address this ambiguity, biologist Tamara A. Franz-Odendaal proposed a revised terminology in 2025.

- Scleral cartilage sensu stricto: Homologous cup-like cartilage in reptiles (including birds) and the ring-like cartilage in teleosts.
- Ocular cartilages: Other, smaller, and often inconsistently present cartilages in the sclera that are not homologous to the scleral cartilage sensu stricto.
  - The cartilage in the posterior eyeball of the teleost Denticeps clupeoides, which ossifies into Di Dario's ossicle.
- Scleral ossicles: Ossifications of the scleral cartilage sensu stricto (i.e., by endochondral ossification), as seen in the scleral rings of many teleosts, and the os opticus in many birds.
- Ocular ossicles: Other bones in the eye that are not derived from the scleral cartilage sensu stricto. For example, the scleral ring in the eyes of birds and reptiles are located at the corneal limbus, and form directly from the mesenchyme without a cartilage precursor. They are not homologous with the scleral ring of the teleosts.

Summary
| Terminology | Anatomical location | Organism | Shape | Ossifies? |
|---|---|---|---|---|
| Scleral cartilage sensu stricto | Extends from back of eyeball towards the corneal limbus | All avians, most reptiles | Cup-like | May ossify (e.g. os opticus) |
| Scleral cartilage sensu stricto | Located in the widest part of the eyeball, near the equator | Almost all teleosts | Ring-like or partial ring | Yes, in some teleosts (forms endochondral scleral ossicles) |
| Intramembranous scleral ossicles | Ring of bones within the corneal limbus | Avians and reptiles | 13–16 flat, rhomboid plates | Yes (no cartilage phase) |
| Ocular cartilages | e.g., posterior eyeball or lower half of orbit | Some teleosts (e.g., Denticeps, Hyphessobrycon) | Irregular, rhomboid | May ossify (e.g., Di Dario's ossicle) |

== Distribution ==
The scleral cartilage sensu stricto is widely distributed:

- It is present in most adult teleost fishes, birds, and other reptiles.
- In sharks and rays, it exists as a cartilaginous capsule that may be strengthened by calcified plates called tesserae.
- In some amphibians, it is present during development but may be absent in the adult stage.
- It is completely absent in placental mammals and marsupials.
- It has been secondarily lost in some reptile lineages, notably snakes.

Evolutionarily, the cartilaginous sclera is a derived condition from an ancestral, purely fibrous scleral capsule, and have likely been gained and lost many times.

== Function ==
The scleral cartilage makes the eyeball more rigid, which serves several purposes:

- Provides attachment sites for extraocular muscles.
- Maintains eyeball shape during rotation.
- Support against internal (intraocular) and external pressures.
  - In birds, which use corneal accommodation, the rigidity of the scleral cartilage prevents the eyeball from deforming as intraocular pressure changes, thus preventing image distortion.
  - In teleosts, this support may be particularly important for species living in deep water where external pressure is high. Since they use lenticular accommodation (moving the lens), intraocular pressure does not change.

== Development ==
It develops from the periocular mesenchyme, which is rather plastic. The mesenchyme may switch between a fibrous and a cartilaginous state, as seen in myopic chickens and in the different morphologies of sighted versus blind cavefish. Even in humans, whose sclera is entirely fibrous, cartilage nodules can occasionally form.

The fate of the cartilage varies. In birds and most reptiles, it remains as a permanent cartilage throughout life. In many teleost species, however, it serves as a replacement cartilage that is partially or fully replaced by bone through endochondral ossification to form scleral ossicles.

The development of scleral cartilage in teleosts like the zebrafish and Mexican tetra begins post-hatching, appearing around 15 days post fertilization. It first forms near the ora serrata and grows into a ring. The inductive signals that trigger its formation are not yet known. Genetic studies in the Mexican tetra suggest that the reduction or loss of scleral ossicles in cave populations is a convergently evolved trait linked to multiple genetic loci, some of which are also responsible for lens degeneration.

The development of avian scleral cartilage is induced by the retinal pigment epithelium (RPE). During embryonic development, a sequence of transcription factors and matrix molecules are expressed in the periocular mesenchyme adjacent to the RPE, beginning with CART1, followed by SOX9, and finally matrix components like aggrecan. The cartilage forms in an anterior-to-posterior direction, starting near the front of the eye and progressing toward the optic nerve.

== Comparative anatomy ==
=== Teleosts ===
In teleosts, the scleral cartilage sensu stricto is typically a ring-like structure located at the widest part of the eyeball. This ring can be a permanent cartilage or a temporary structure that is later replaced by bone. In some species, a scleral ring develops from it. It usually has 2 parts, one rostral (anterior) and one caudal (posterior), which serve as attachment points for the eye muscles. The extent of ossification varies widely, from partial replacement in the zebrafish to complete replacement in the swordfish.

A unique mode of bone formation termed "unilateral periskeletal ossification" has been described in zebrafish, where bone forms from an extension of the perichondrium rather than directly replacing the cartilage matrix.

The blind cave-dwelling form of the Mexican tetra (Astyanax mexicanus) presents a notable exception, possessing a cup-like scleral cartilage rather than a ring, a morphology more similar to that of avians.

=== Birds ===
In all birds, the scleral cartilage sensu stricto is a permanent, cup-like hyaline cartilage adjacent to the retina. Its shape depends on the overall shape of the eye, ranging from a deep cup in chickens with round eyes to a shallower cup in owls with tubular eyes. At the posterior pole of the eye, surrounding the optic nerve, there may be a small, horseshoe-shaped bone called the os opticus ossifies from the scleral cartilage. The scleral ring does not develop from the cup.

The avian scleral cartilage is composed of chondrocytes in an extracellular matrix rich in collagen type II, aggrecan, and other proteoglycans. It forms the inner, cartilaginous layer of the sclera, while the outer layer remains fibrous.

== See also ==
- Sclera
- Scleral ring
- Cartilage
