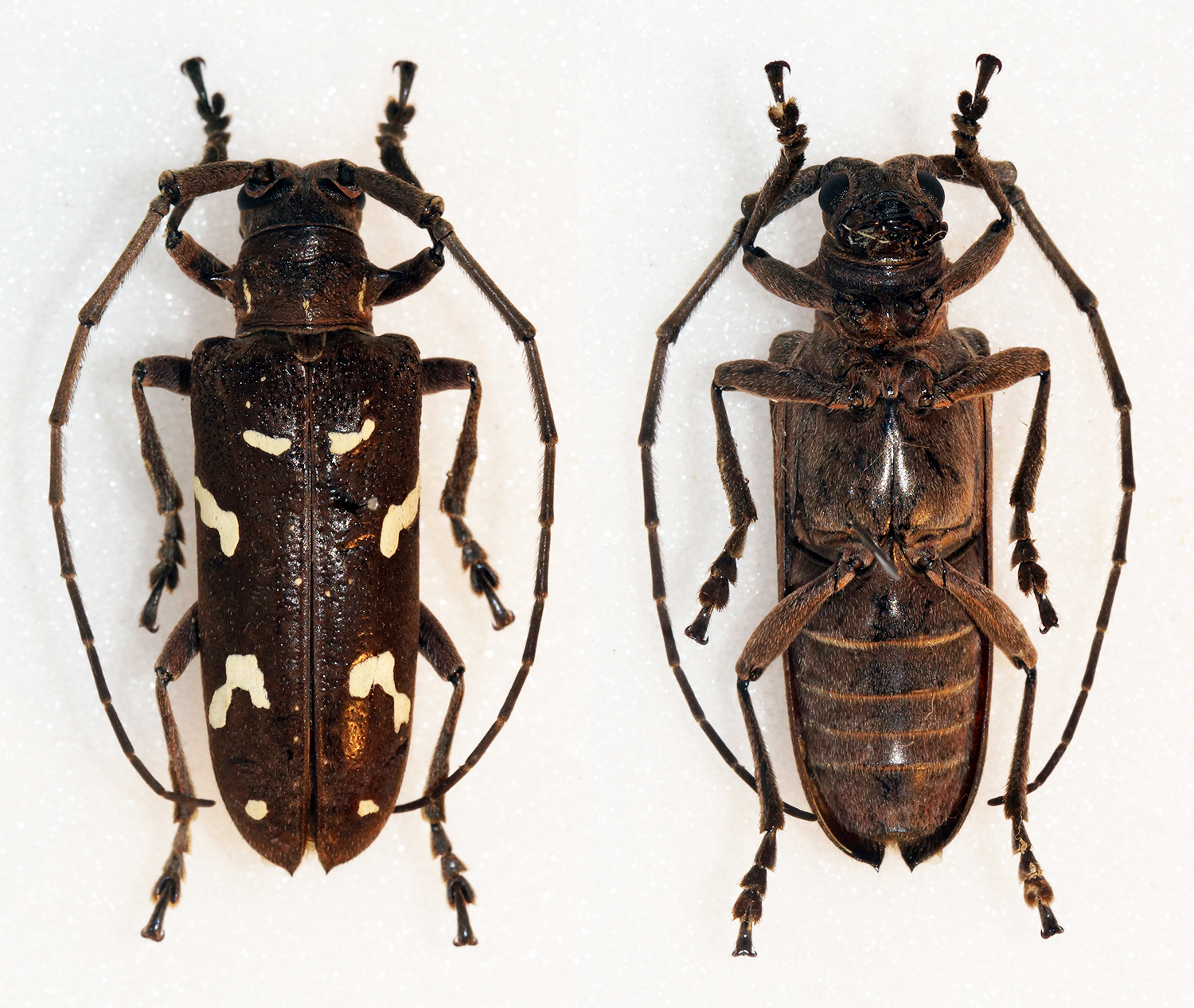

Scientific classification
- Kingdom: Animalia
- Phylum: Arthropoda
- Clade: Pancrustacea
- Class: Insecta
- Order: Coleoptera
- Suborder: Polyphaga
- Infraorder: Cucujiformia
- Family: Cerambycidae
- Genus: Hammatoderus
- Species: H. thoracicus

Binomial name
- Hammatoderus thoracicus (White, 1858)

Synonyms
- Hammatoderus jacobyi Nonfried, 1894; Hammoderus quadriplagiatus Breuning, 1943; Hammoderus spinipennis Thomson, 1860; Hammoderus thoracicus White, 1858; Plagiohammus jacobyi (Nonfried, 1894); Plagiohammus quadriplagiatus (Breuning, 1943); Plagiohammus spinipennis (Thomson, 1860); Plagiohammus thoracicus (White, 1858)

= Hammatoderus thoracicus =

Species of beetle

Hammatoderus thoracicus is a species of beetle in the family Cerambycidae. It was described by White in 1858. It is known from Ecuador, Mexico, Costa Rica, Guatemala, Panama, Honduras, Colombia, Nicaragua, Peru, El Salvador, and Venezuela.
