= Neoporus aulicus =

Scientific classification
- Domain: Eukaryota
- Kingdom: Animalia
- Phylum: Arthropoda
- Class: Insecta
- Order: Coleoptera
- Suborder: Adephaga
- Family: Dytiscidae
- Genus: Neoporus
- Species: N. aulicus

Binomial name
- Neoporus aulicus (Aubé, 1838)

Synonyms
- Hydroporus aulicus Aubé, 1838

Species of beetle

Neoporus aulicus is a species of predaceous diving beetle in the family Dytiscidae. It is found in North America.
