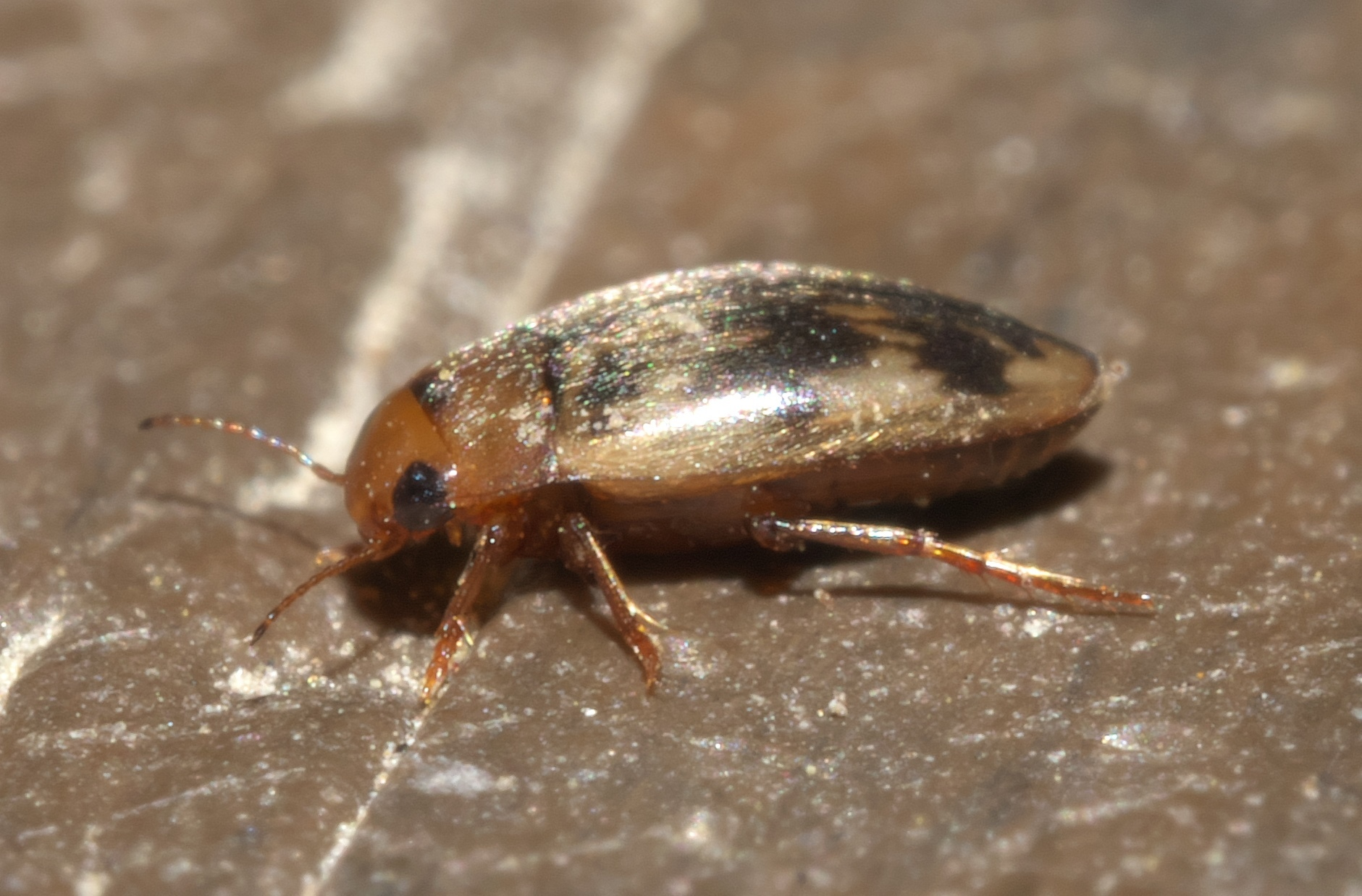
- Neoporus shermani, Oklahoma

Scientific classification
- Domain: Eukaryota
- Kingdom: Animalia
- Phylum: Arthropoda
- Class: Insecta
- Order: Coleoptera
- Suborder: Adephaga
- Family: Dytiscidae
- Genus: Neoporus
- Species: N. shermani

Binomial name
- Neoporus shermani (Fall, 1917)

Synonyms
- Hydroporus shermani Fall, 1917

= Neoporus shermani =

Species of beetle

Neoporus shermani is a species of predaceous diving beetle in the family Dytiscidae. It is found in North America.
