= Neoporus spurius =

Scientific classification
- Domain: Eukaryota
- Kingdom: Animalia
- Phylum: Arthropoda
- Class: Insecta
- Order: Coleoptera
- Suborder: Adephaga
- Family: Dytiscidae
- Genus: Neoporus
- Species: N. spurius

Binomial name
- Neoporus spurius (LeConte, 1855)

Synonyms
- Hydroporus spurius LeConte, 1855

Species of beetle

Neoporus spurius is a species of predaceous diving beetle in the family Dytiscidae. It is found in North America.
