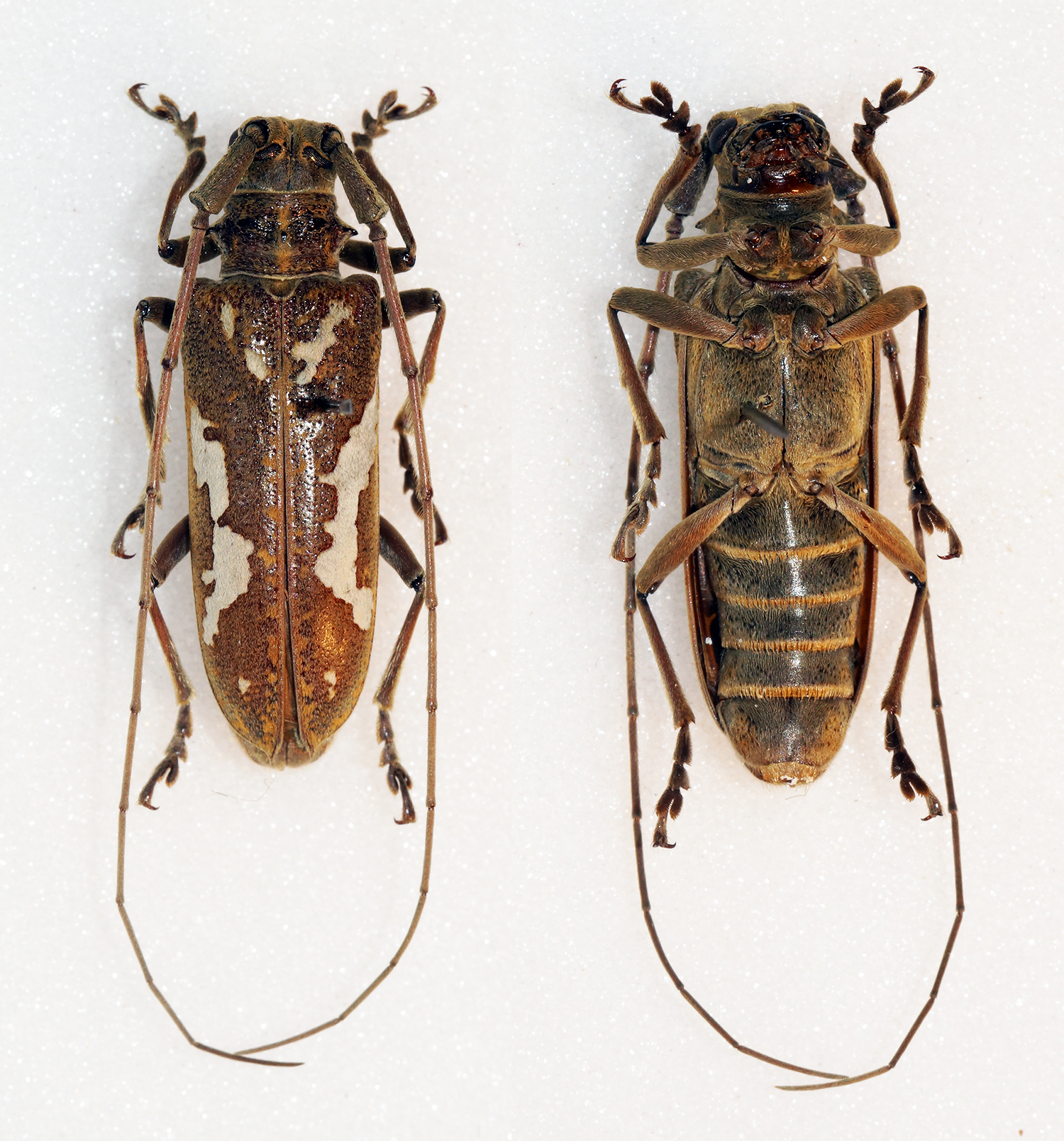

Scientific classification
- Domain: Eukaryota
- Kingdom: Animalia
- Phylum: Arthropoda
- Class: Insecta
- Order: Coleoptera
- Suborder: Polyphaga
- Infraorder: Cucujiformia
- Family: Cerambycidae
- Tribe: Lamiini
- Genus: Hammatoderus
- Species: H. lunaris

Binomial name
- Hammatoderus lunaris (Bates, 1880)

Synonyms
- Plagiohammus lunaris (Bates, 1880)

= Hammatoderus lunaris =

Species of beetle

Hammatoderus lunaris is a species of beetle in the family Cerambycidae. It was described by Henry Walter Bates in 1880. It is known from Mexico.
