= Hammatoderus colombiensis =

Scientific classification
- Domain: Eukaryota
- Kingdom: Animalia
- Phylum: Arthropoda
- Class: Insecta
- Order: Coleoptera
- Suborder: Polyphaga
- Infraorder: Cucujiformia
- Family: Cerambycidae
- Tribe: Lamiini
- Genus: Hammatoderus
- Species: H. colombiensis

Binomial name
- Hammatoderus colombiensis (Constantino, Benavides & Esteban, 2014)

Synonyms
- Plagiohammus colombiensis Constantino, Benavides & Esteban, 2014

Species of beetle

Hammatoderus colombiensis is a species of beetle in the family Cerambycidae. It was described by Constantino, Benavides and Esteban in 2014. It is known from Colombia.
