= Hammatoderus nitidus =

Scientific classification
- Domain: Eukaryota
- Kingdom: Animalia
- Phylum: Arthropoda
- Class: Insecta
- Order: Coleoptera
- Suborder: Polyphaga
- Infraorder: Cucujiformia
- Family: Cerambycidae
- Tribe: Lamiini
- Genus: Hammatoderus
- Species: H. nitidus

Binomial name
- Hammatoderus nitidus (Bates, 1874)

Synonyms
- Hammoderus nitidus Bates, 1874; Plagiohammus nitidus (Bates, 1874)

Species of beetle

Hammatoderus nitidus is a species of beetle in the family Cerambycidae. It was described by Henry Walter Bates in 1874. It is known from Nicaragua.
