= Hammatoderus thiodes =

Scientific classification
- Domain: Eukaryota
- Kingdom: Animalia
- Phylum: Arthropoda
- Class: Insecta
- Order: Coleoptera
- Suborder: Polyphaga
- Infraorder: Cucujiformia
- Family: Cerambycidae
- Tribe: Lamiini
- Genus: Hammatoderus
- Species: H. thiodes

Binomial name
- Hammatoderus thiodes (Bates, 1880)

Synonyms
- Hammoderus thiodes Bates, 1880; Plagiohammus thiodes (Bates, 1880)

Species of beetle

Hammatoderus thiodes is a species of beetle in the family Cerambycidae. It was described by Henry Walter Bates in 1880. It is known from Panama and Costa Rica.
