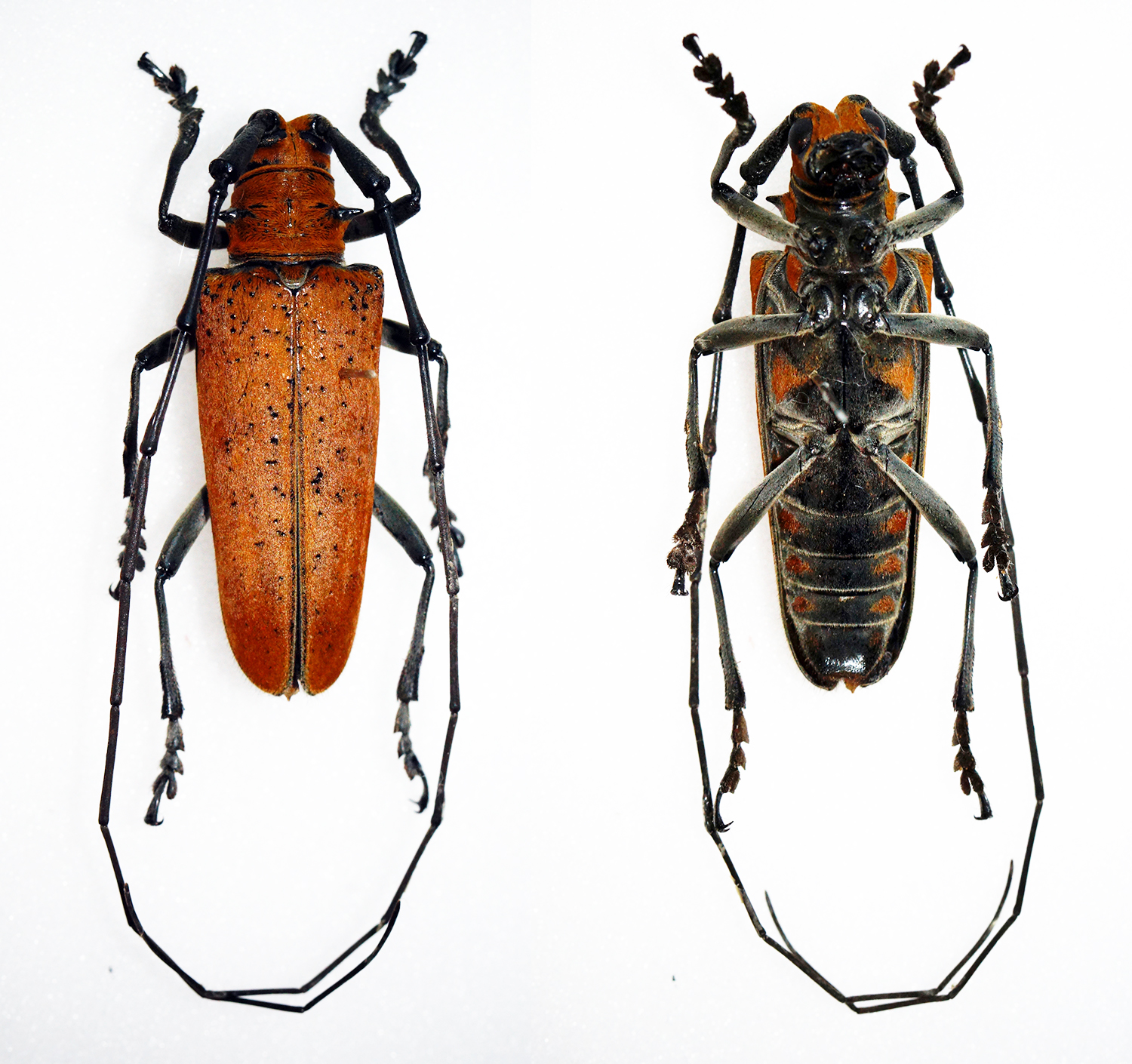

Scientific classification
- Kingdom: Animalia
- Phylum: Arthropoda
- Class: Insecta
- Order: Coleoptera
- Suborder: Polyphaga
- Infraorder: Cucujiformia
- Family: Cerambycidae
- Genus: Hammatoderus
- Species: H. pollinosus

Binomial name
- Hammatoderus pollinosus (Bates, 1880)

Synonyms
- Hammoderus pollinosus Bates, 1880; Plagiohammus pollinosus (Bates, 1880); Plagiohammus rotundipennis Breuning, 1950

= Hammatoderus pollinosus =

Species of beetle

Hammatoderus pollinosus is a species of beetle in the family Cerambycidae. It was described by Henry Walter Bates in 1880. It is known from Costa Rica.
