= Hammatoderus laceratus =

Scientific classification
- Domain: Eukaryota
- Kingdom: Animalia
- Phylum: Arthropoda
- Class: Insecta
- Order: Coleoptera
- Suborder: Polyphaga
- Infraorder: Cucujiformia
- Family: Cerambycidae
- Tribe: Lamiini
- Genus: Hammatoderus
- Species: H. laceratus

Binomial name
- Hammatoderus laceratus (Bates, 1885)

Synonyms
- Hammoderus laceratus Bates, 1885; Plagiohammus laceratus (Bates, 1885)

Species of beetle

Hammatoderus laceratus is a species of beetle in the family Cerambycidae. It was described by Henry Walter Bates in 1885. It is known from Mexico.
