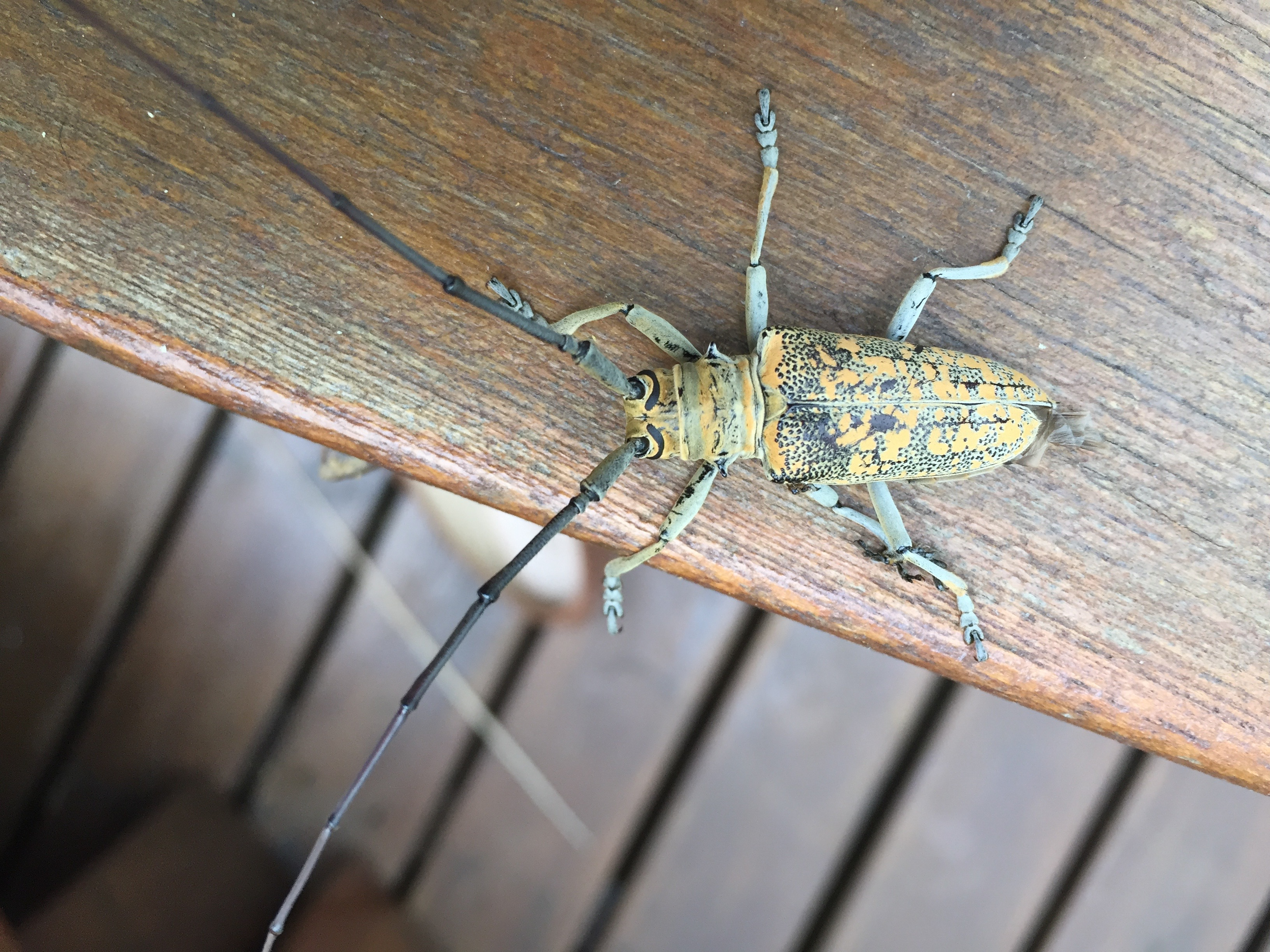

Scientific classification
- Domain: Eukaryota
- Kingdom: Animalia
- Phylum: Arthropoda
- Class: Insecta
- Order: Coleoptera
- Suborder: Polyphaga
- Infraorder: Cucujiformia
- Family: Cerambycidae
- Tribe: Lamiini
- Genus: Hammatoderus
- Species: H. confusor

Binomial name
- Hammatoderus confusor (Dillon & Dillon, 1941)

Synonyms
- Plagiohammus confusor Dillon & Dillon, 1941; Hammoderus brasiliensis Breuning, 1943; Plagiohammus camillus Dillon & Dillon, 1949

= Hammatoderus confusor =

Species of beetle

Hammatoderus confusor is a species of beetle in the family Cerambycidae. It was described by Dillon and Dillon in 1941. Its Geographical distribution is Brazil (Goiás, Santa Catarina, Rio Grande do Sul, São Paulo), Peru, Bolivia (Santa Cruz), Paraguay, Colombia (Valle del Cauca and Meta) and Argentina (Misiones).

Its size varies from 32.0 to 33.3 mm in males and from 29.1 to 35.2 mm in females.
