= Scleral ring =

Ring of bone supporting the eye

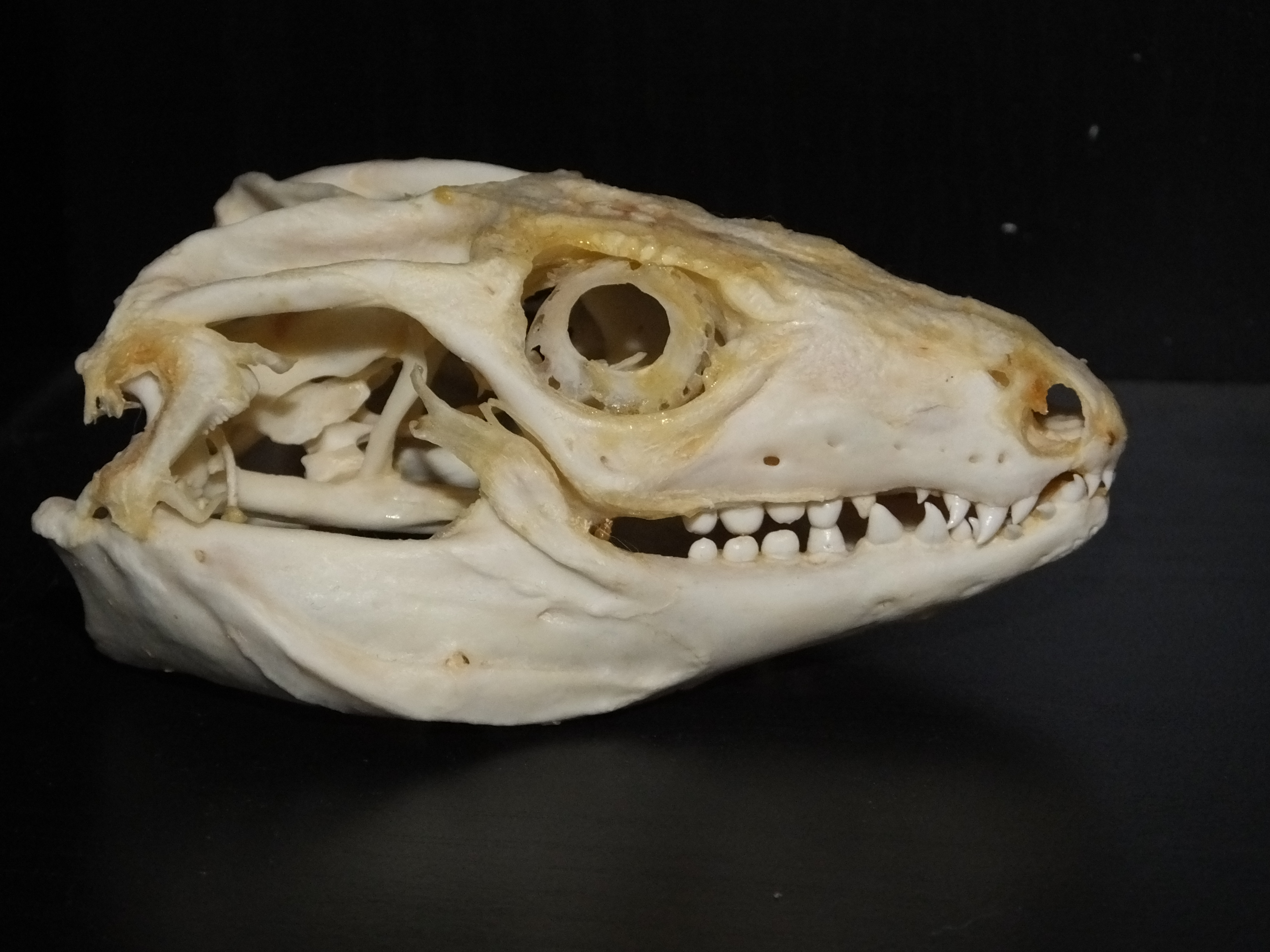
Skull of the red tegu (Salvator rufescens) including a scleral ring

The scleral ring (also sclerotic ring) is a hardened ring of bony plates found in the eye of several groups of vertebrates. Mammals, amphibians, snakes, and crocodilians lack scleral rings. The ring is in the fibrous outer layer of the eye, called the sclera.

Scleral rings can be made of cartilaginous material (scleral cartilage) or bony material (scleral ossicles), or often a combination of both, that comes together to form a ring. The arrangement, size, shape, and number of ossicles vary by group. They are believed to have a role in supporting the eye, especially in animals whose eyes are not spherical, or which live underwater.

== Terminology ==
The structure is referred to as scleral ring or the sclerotic ring. The individual bones in the ring are the scleral ossicles if bony, or scleral cartilage if cartilaginous. The Latin name is Anulus [Annulus] ossicularis sclerae.

In some species, there may be a cartilaginous cup in the posterior half of the eye. Any ossification in the cup is called Ossicula posteriora sclerae. In birds, there is sometimes an ossification around the optic nerve, called the os opticus.

Because the word sclerotic often implies pathology of the sclera (see "sclerosis", an unrelated medical condition), some authors have urged using only "scleral ring" and avoiding "sclerotic ring", to avoid confusion and to increase the utility of character comparisons.

Rudolf Leuckart claims that the scleral ring was already noted in De arte venandi cum avibus. It was first discovered by Volcher Coiter in the 1570s, then rediscovered by Malpighi in the eye of an eagle. A 1931 thesis made an exhaustive study.

== Function ==
Scleral rings may help support inner structures of the eye, especially in animals that do not have round eyes. Animals that move rapidly, including both fast flying birds and fast swimming fish have the most robust scleral rings, indicating that these thick rings are used to protect the eye during intense changes in pressure in the air and in the water.

In birds, the eye is generally of a hemispherical shape on the posterior half. The anterior half may be of 3 shapes: flat (as in most diurnal birds), globose (as in Falconiformes and many Passeriformes), and tubular (as in owls). In all cases, the eye shape diverges significantly from an ellipsoidal shape in the anterior end, and the corneal limbus is usually curved inwards. This is hypothesized to require mechanical reinforcement by the scleral ring. A cartilaginous cup reinforces the posterior end.

Additionally, scleral rings may help the eye adjust to different viewing distances, also known as visual accommodation. Muscles are used to adjust the shape of the eye for accommodation, and the rings provide attachment sites for these muscles. In aquatic animals, the lens is squeezed in a different way to compensate for differences in light refraction underwater, and so the shape of the ring can be different than those in terrestrial animals.

The ratio between the inner radius of the scleral ring and the radius of the orbit is correlated with ecology. It is larger in modern nocturnal birds than modern diurnal birds. This has been used as evidence for arguing that some dinosaurs were nocturnal.

== Development ==
Two distinct types of scleral ring are known: those that ossify intramembranously, and those that ossify endchondrally. Endochondral ossicles of the eye ossify from the ocular cartilages and/or the scleral cartilage sensu stricto; this is known to happen among teleost fish. Among reptiles (including birds), the scleral ring ossifies from membrane without a cartilaginous phase; these have been termed intramembranous scleral ossicles.

== Evolution ==
=== Fish ===
The earliest possible scleral rings occur in arandaspids, a group of jawless fish from the Ordovician period. Indisputable scleral rings are present among Osteostraci, the sister taxon of jawed fishes. These scleral rings are made of dermal bone.

Scleral rings made of dermal bone are present in a number of fossil gnathostomes; indeed, the presence of five scleral dermal scleral ossicles is considered a synapomorphy of gnathostomata. They are present in early lungfish and early chondrichthyans. Scleral rings in Acanthodians have historically been confused with circumorbital bones. Scleral rings are present in placoderms; among early Devonian species, five ossicles are typically present. In the Arthrodira, the typical number of ossicles is 4. Among antiarchs and the maxillate placoderms Entelognathus and Qilinyu, three ossicles are present. In Entelognathus, these ossicles are fused to the dermal bone of the skull. Scleral rings of placoderms are generally dermal bone; however, in some placoderms the scleral cartilages also ossify.

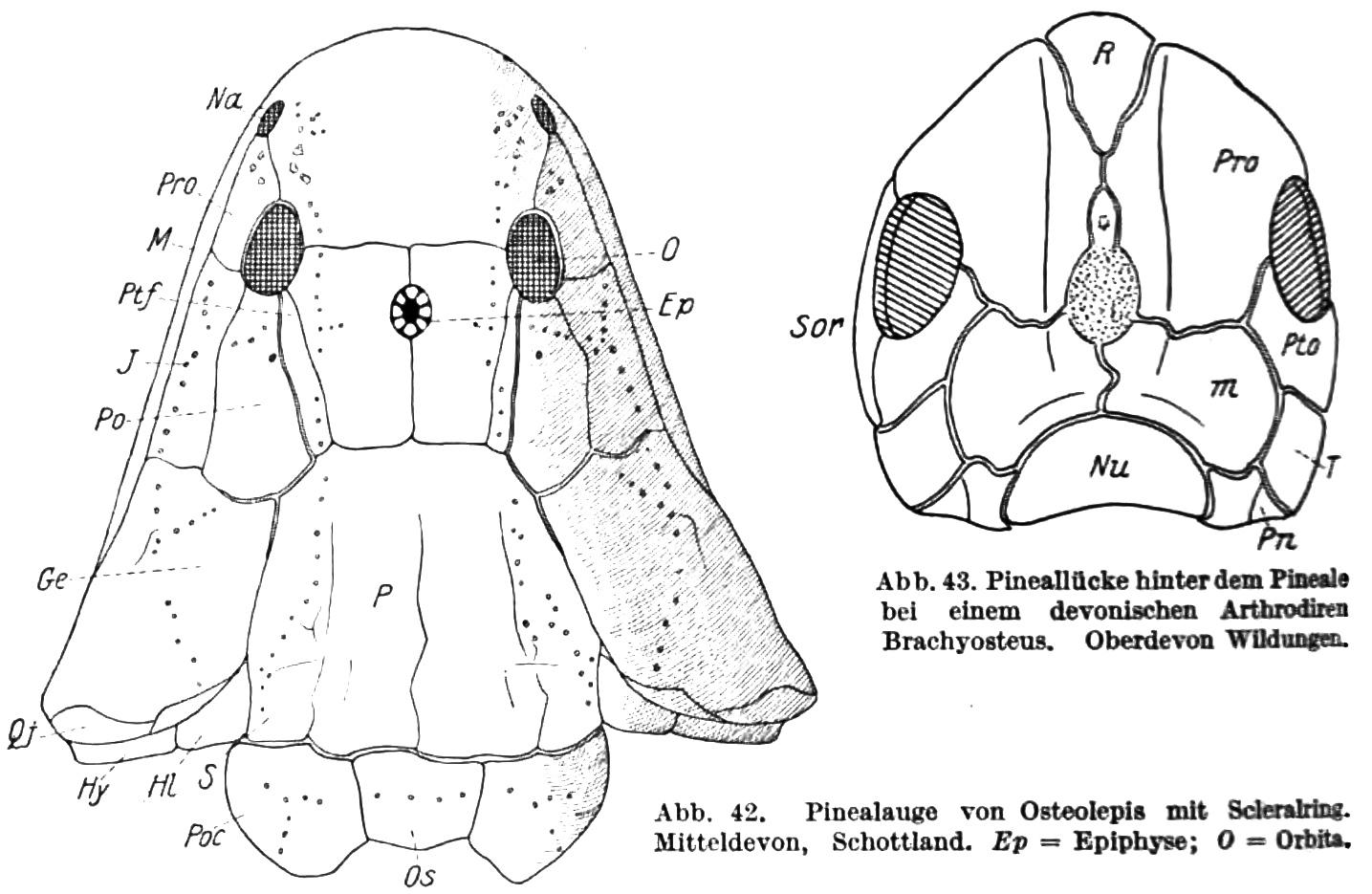
Extinct Osteolepis, showing prominent scleral ring on its parietal eye

While scleral cartilages are ancestrally present in fish, teleost fish are the only extant clade with scleral rings; they are absent in the clades Cladistia, Chondrostei, Lepisosteiformes, and Amiiformes. As basal actinopterygians lack scleral rings, they are considered to have arisen separately from those of ancestral gnathostomes; the scleral rings of teleosts are endochondral in origin, rather than dermal.

Teleost fish typically have only one or two ossicles per ring, and fish with no ossicles still retain cartilage. Most teleosts do not have ossicles, but this can vary even within groups. As a general trend, more basal groups (such as Elopomorpha and Osteoglossomorpha) tend to have no ossicles, while more derived groups (such as Percomorpha) are likely to have a variable number of ossicles (zero to two).

More active fish are more likely to have scleral rings, indicating that the rings help keep the eye stable during rapid swimming.

In the fossil sarcopterygian Osteolepis, the parietal eye also has a scleral ring.

=== Sauropsida ===
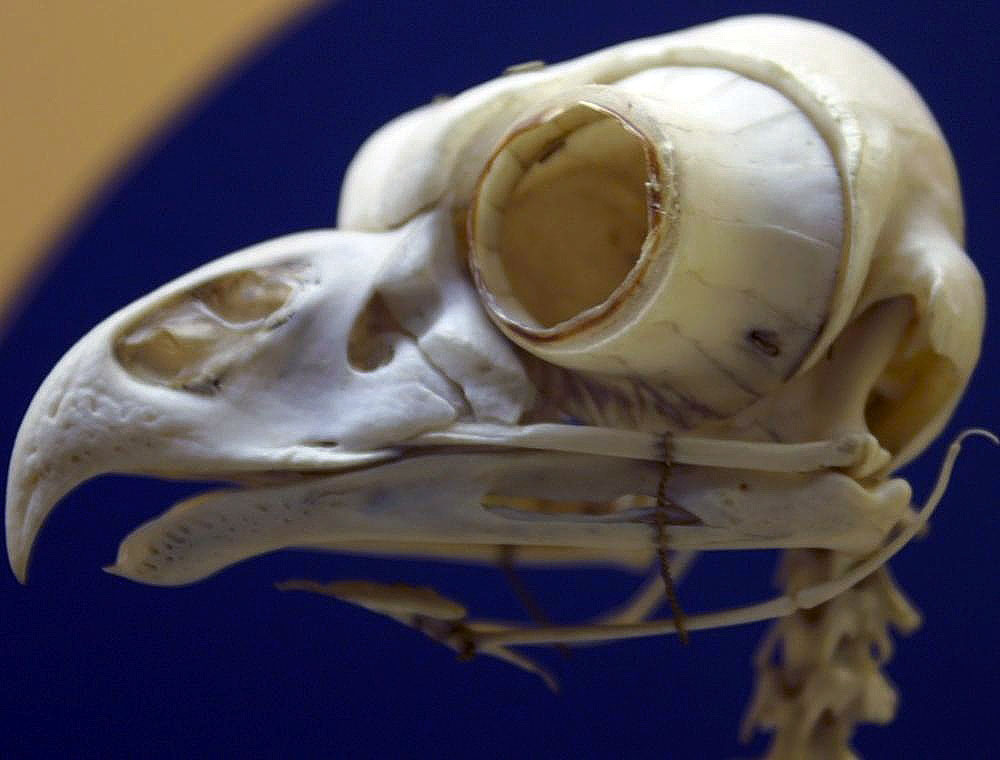
Great horned owl (Bubo virginianus), showing tubular scleral rings typical of owls

Among reptiles, a combination of scleral cartilage and ossicles are present; the cartilage acts as a cup around the posterior (rear) position of the eye, and ossicles at the anterior (front) position of the eye form the ring. Unlike the scleral ossicles of teleosts, the scleral ossicles of sauropsids are located on the corneal limbus, anterior to the cartilaginous cup; they ossify intramembranously, and not from the scleral or ocular cartilages.

Within lepidosaurs (snakes, lizards, tuatara, and relatives), scleral rings have been found in all major lineages except Serpentes (snakes), and two non-snake families within Squamata: Dibamidae and Rhineuridae, which are both legless lizard families. All of these clades that lack a scleral ring share either a burrowing lifestyle or lack of limbs, indicating a possible correlation among these traits and loss of the scleral ring. Lizards typically have 14 ossicles in the ring, though this can vary. Mosasaurs, a clade of extinct marine squamates, also have scleral rings, as do members of the non-squamate Ichthyopterygia.

Within modern members of Archelosauria (turtles, birds, crocodilians, and relatives), only birds and turtles retain the scleral rings. Early crocodylomorphs such as Terrestrisuchus and thalattosuchians retain scleral rings, but members of Neosuchia including modern crocodilians lack them, though there may have been multiple losses and/or gains of scleral ossicles within crocodile-line archosaurs. Scleral rings of varying lengths, curvatures, numbers of ossicles, and thickness are found in all birds. Birds typically have 12-18 ossicles, with 14 being the most common number.

=== Synapsida ===
Many non-mammalian synapsids possessed scleral rings; these were retained by non-mammalian cynodonts, at least as closely related to modern mammals as Mammaliamorpha (as indicated by their presence in Tritylodontidae), but have been lost in modern mammals.

== Gallery ==
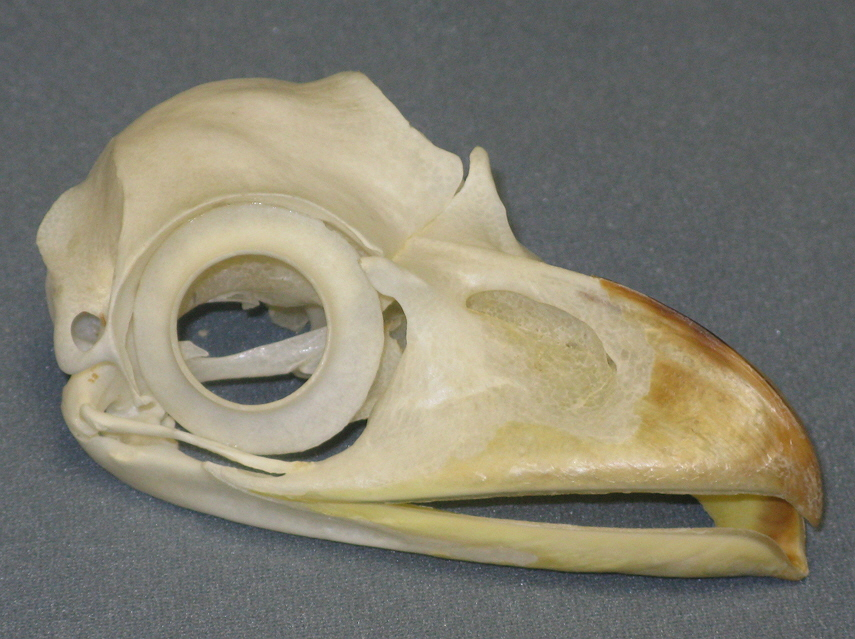
Tawny frogmouth (Podargus strigoides), showing large scleral rings

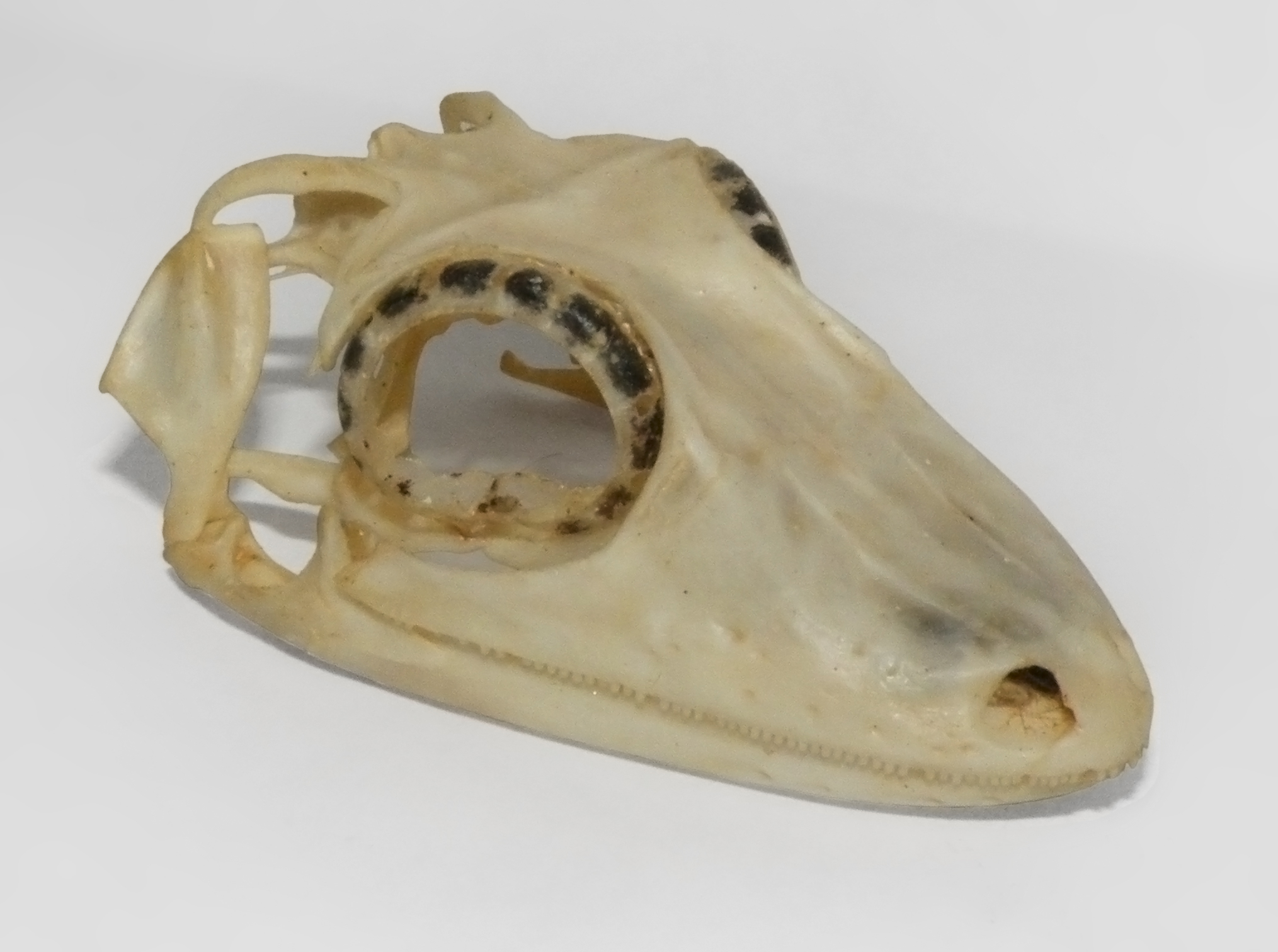
Satanic leaf-tailed gecko (Uroplatus phantasticus), showing large scleral rings.

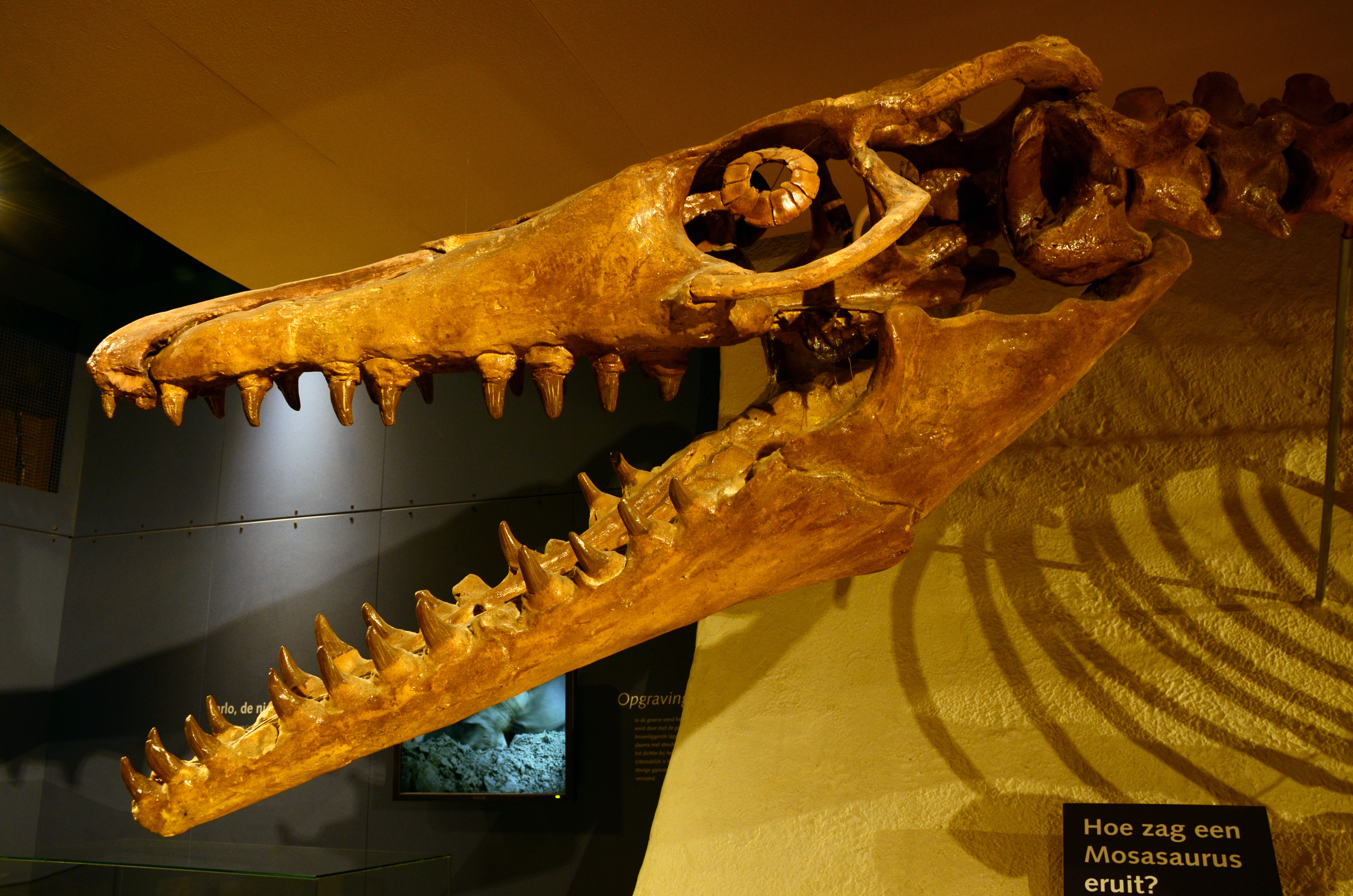
Reconstructed skull and scleral ring of †Mosasaurus hoffmanni

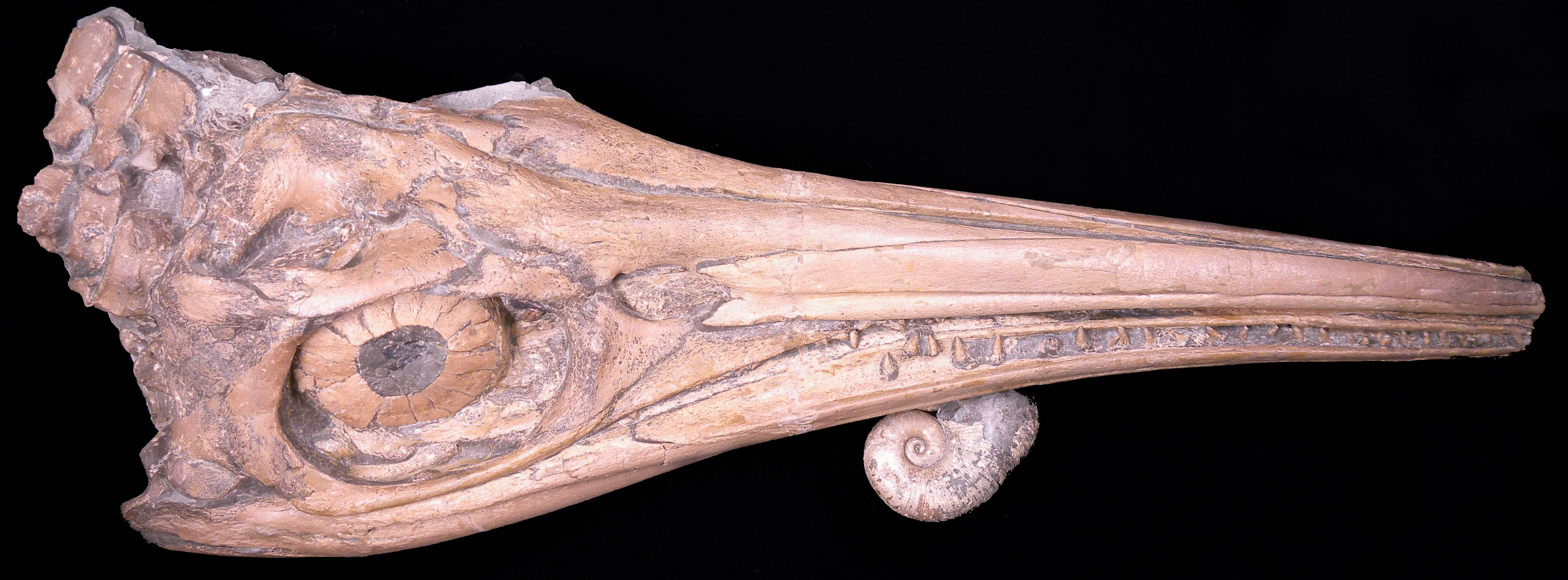
†Stenopterygius quadriscissus, an ichthyosaur with a large scleral ring

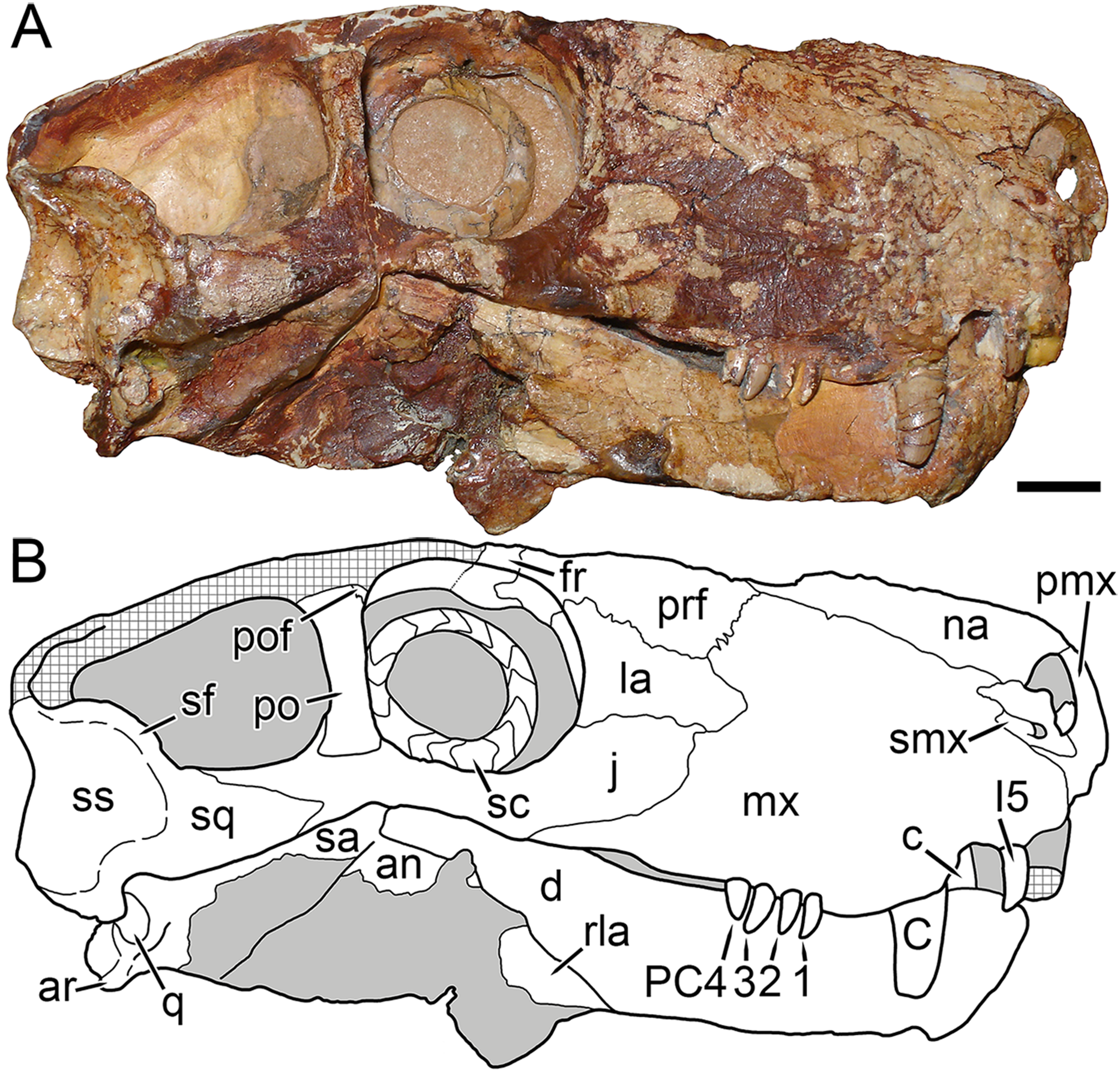
†Viatkogorgon, a gorgonopsian therapsid ('mammal predecessor')

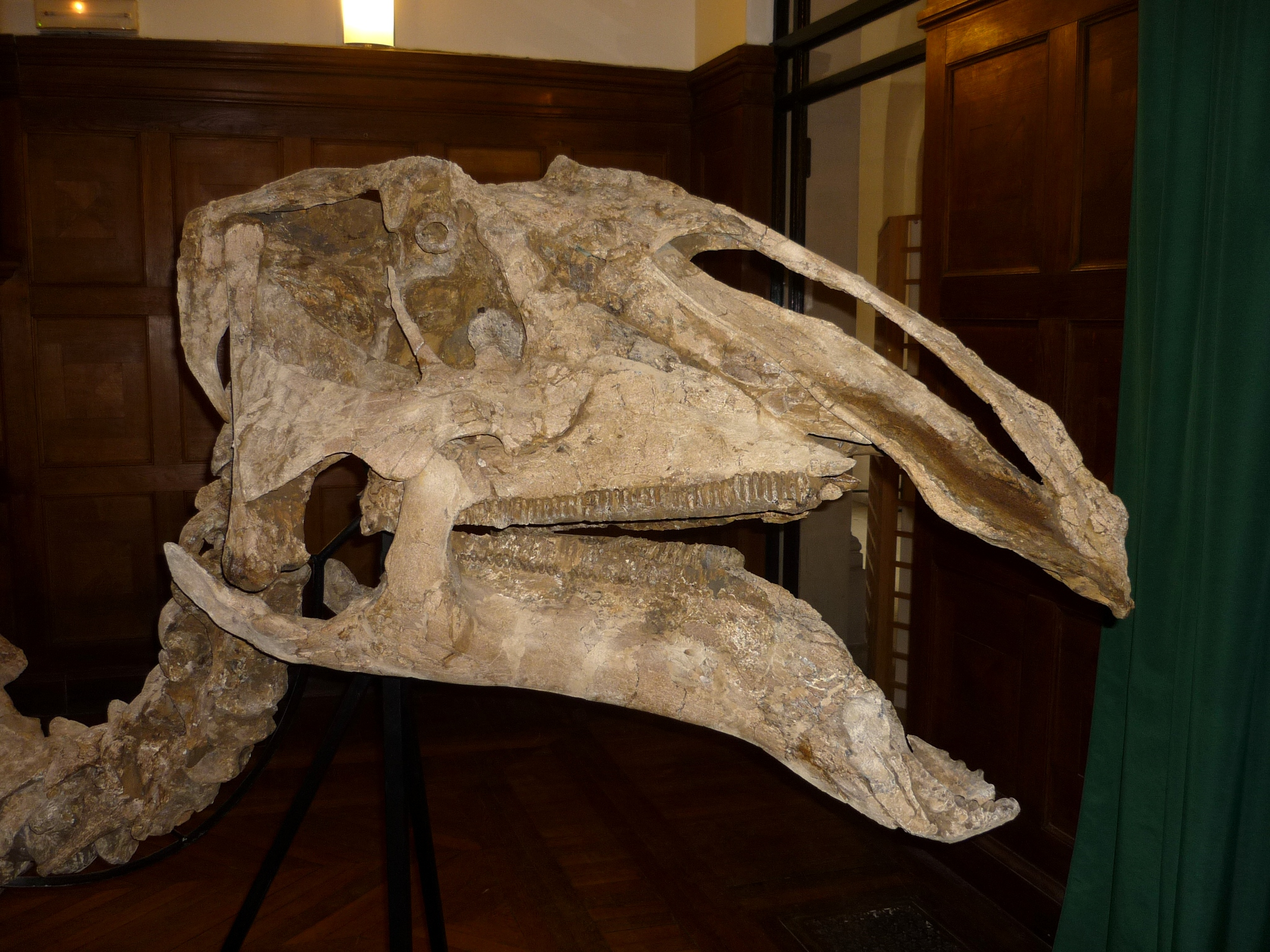
Prosaurolophus, a hadrosaurid dinosaur with a small scleral ring

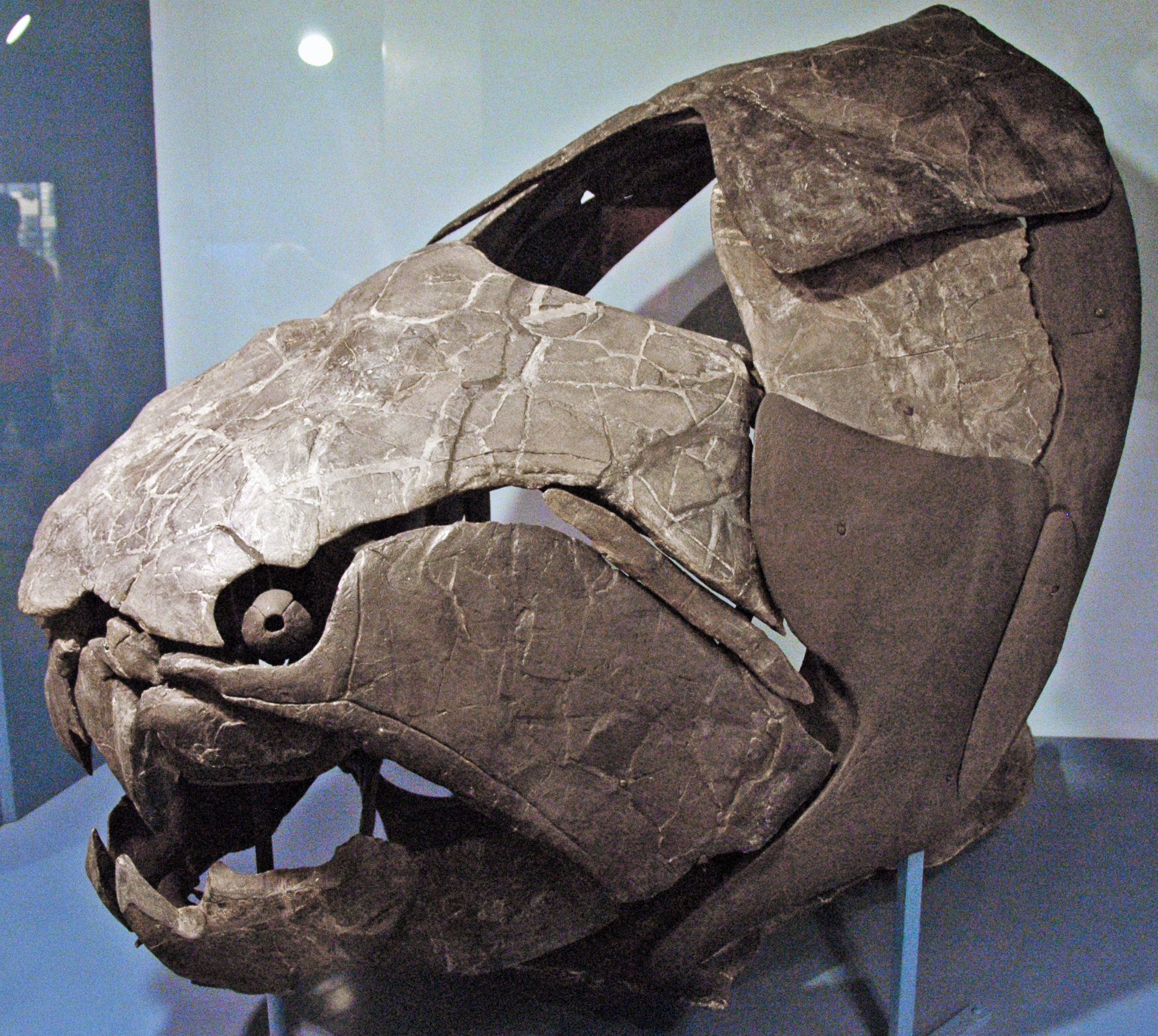
Extinct Dunkleosteus terrelli, showing four ossicles in the ring characteristic of the Arthrodira

== See also ==
- Os opticus
- Scleral cartilage
- Di Dario's ossicle
