= Neoporus superioris =

Scientific classification
- Domain: Eukaryota
- Kingdom: Animalia
- Phylum: Arthropoda
- Class: Insecta
- Order: Coleoptera
- Suborder: Adephaga
- Family: Dytiscidae
- Genus: Neoporus
- Species: N. superioris

Binomial name
- Neoporus superioris (J. Balfour-Browne, 1944)

Synonyms
- Hydroporus superioris J. Balfour-Browne, 1944

Species of beetle

Neoporus superioris is a species of predaceous diving beetle in the family Dytiscidae. It is found in North America.
