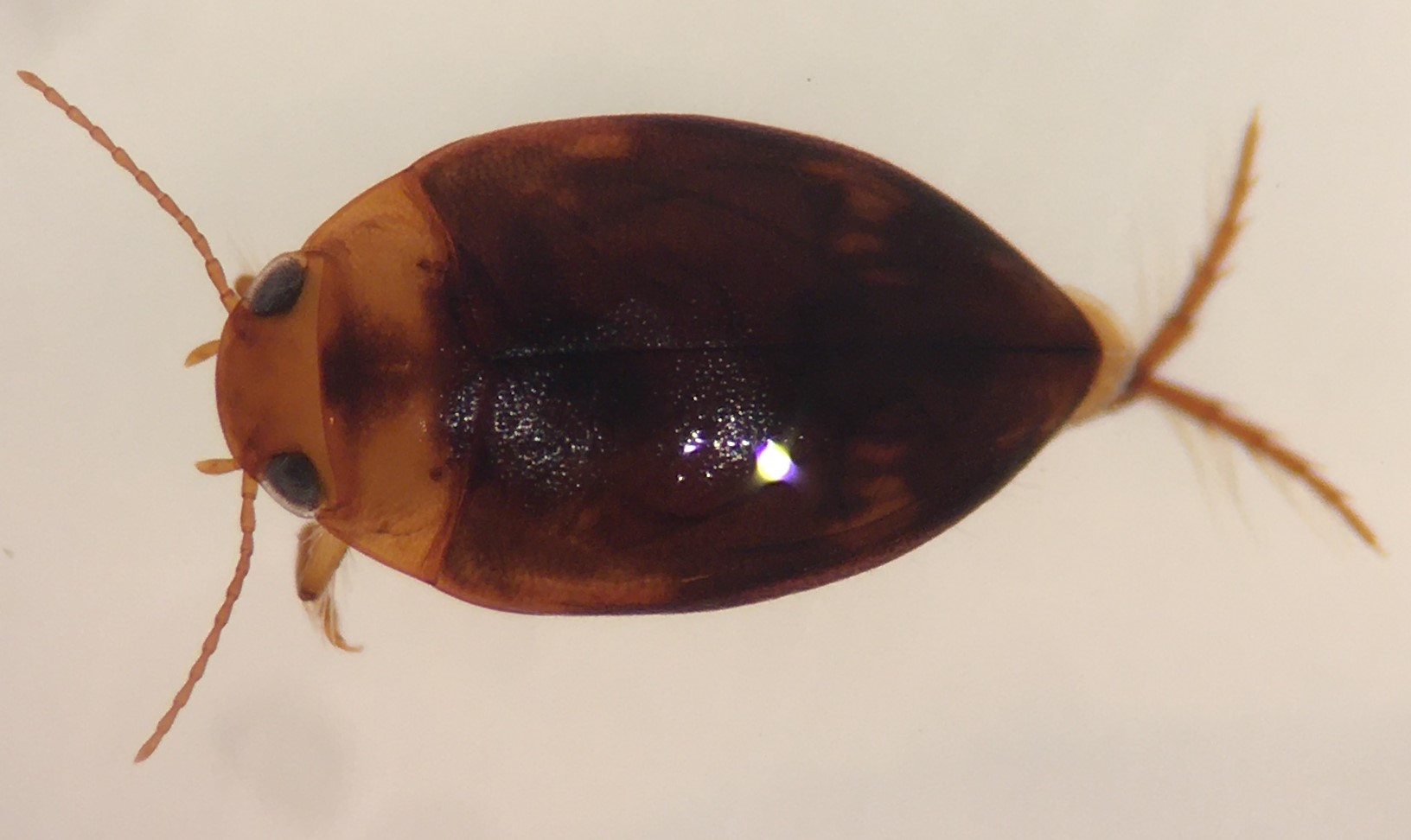
- Neoporus dilatatus

Scientific classification
- Kingdom: Animalia
- Phylum: Arthropoda
- Class: Insecta
- Order: Coleoptera
- Suborder: Adephaga
- Family: Dytiscidae
- Tribe: Hydroporini
- Genus: Neoporus; Guignot, 1931

species
- See text

= Neoporus =

Genus of beetles

Neoporus is a genus of beetle in the family Dytiscidae. These are the predaceous diving beetles, a family of water beetles. Their larvae are commonly known as water tigers. Neoporus is one of over 160 genera in family Dytiscidae.

== Species ==
- N. arizonicus Fall, 1917
- N. asidytus Young, 1984
- N. aulicus Aubé, 1838
- N. baelus Young, 1984
- N. blanchardi Sherman, 1913
- N. carolinus Fall, 1917
- N. cimicoides Sharp, 1882
- N. clypealis Sharp, 1882
- N. dilatatus Fall, 1917
- N. dimidiatus Gemminger and Harold, 1868
- N. dixianus Fall, 1917
- N. effeminatus Fall, 1923
- N. floridanus Young, 1940
- N. gaudens Fall, 1923
- N. hebes Fall, 1923
- N. helocrinus Young, 1967
- N. hybridus Aubé, 1838
- N. latocavus Wolfe, 1984
- N. lecontei Nilsson, 2001
- N. lobatus Sharp, 1882
- N. lynceus Sharp, 1882
- N. mellitus LeConte, 1855
- N. pratus Wolfe, 1984
- N. psammodytes Young, 1978
- N. rheocrinus Young, 1967
- N. semiflavus Fall, 1917
- N. shermani Fall, 1917
- N. spurius LeConte, 1855
- N. striatopunctatus F. E. Melsheimer, 1844
- N. sulcipennis Fall, 1917
- N. superioris J. Balfour-Browne, 1944
- N. tennetum Wolfe, 1984
- N. tigrinus Fall, 1917
- N. undulatus Say, 1823
- N. uniformis Blatchley, 1925
- N. venustus LeConte, 1855
- N. vitiosus LeConte, 1855
- N. vittatipennis Gemminger and Harold, 1868
- N. vittatus LeConte, 1855
