= Hammatoderus sticticus =

Scientific classification
- Domain: Eukaryota
- Kingdom: Animalia
- Phylum: Arthropoda
- Class: Insecta
- Order: Coleoptera
- Suborder: Polyphaga
- Infraorder: Cucujiformia
- Family: Cerambycidae
- Tribe: Lamiini
- Genus: Hammatoderus
- Species: H. sticticus

Binomial name
- Hammatoderus sticticus (Bates, 1874)

Synonyms
- Hammoderus sticticus Bates, 1874; Plagiohammus sticticus (Bates, 1874)

Species of beetle

Hammatoderus sticticus is a species of beetle in the family Cerambycidae. It was described by Henry Walter Bates in 1874. It is known from Ecuador.
