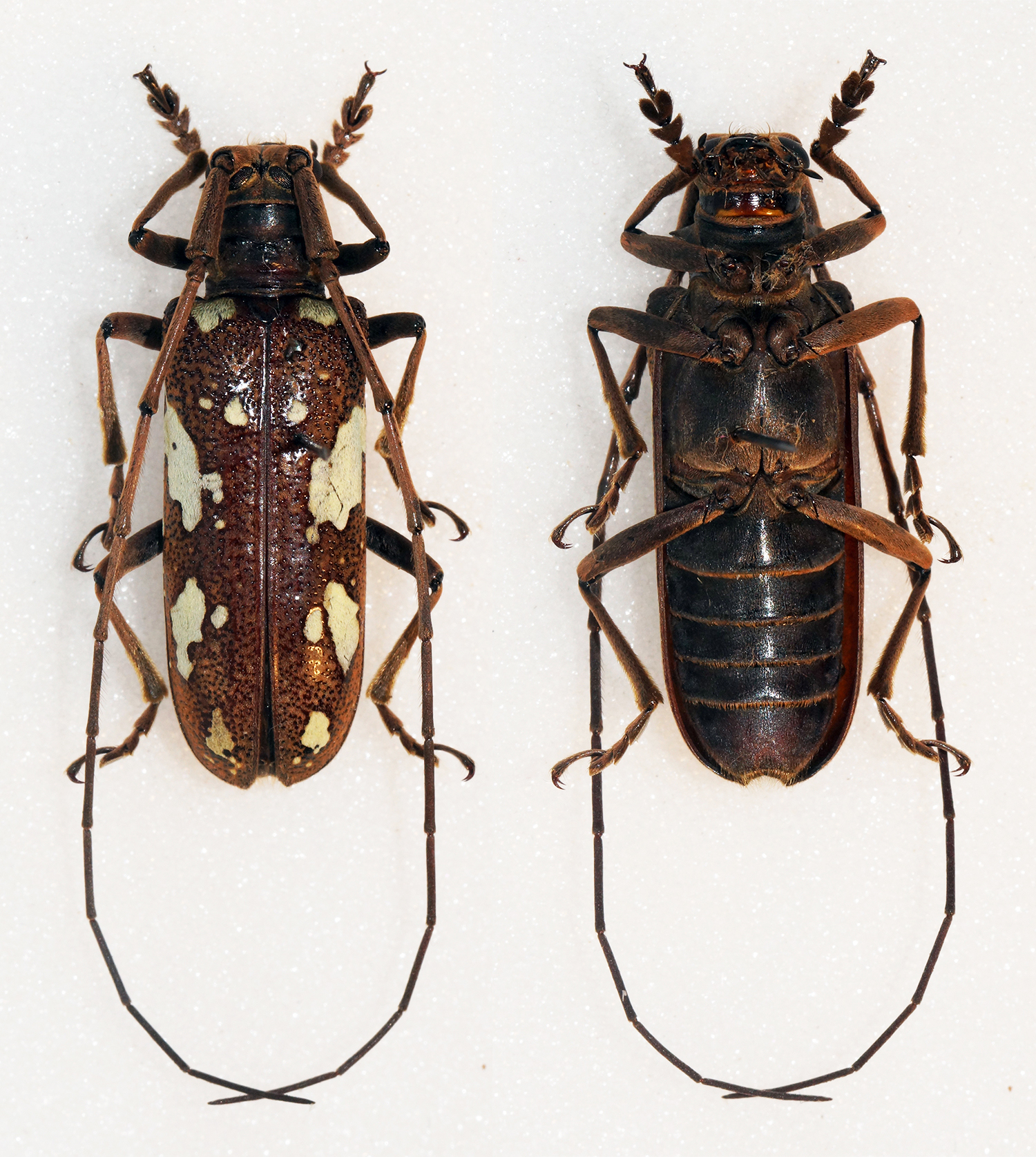

Scientific classification
- Domain: Eukaryota
- Kingdom: Animalia
- Phylum: Arthropoda
- Class: Insecta
- Order: Coleoptera
- Suborder: Polyphaga
- Infraorder: Cucujiformia
- Family: Cerambycidae
- Tribe: Lamiini
- Genus: Hammatoderus
- Species: H. inermis

Binomial name
- Hammatoderus inermis (Thomson, 1857)

Synonyms
- Hammoderus inermis Bates, 1872; Plagiohammus inermis (Thomson, 1857); Taeniotes albiplagiatus White, 1858; Taeniotes inermis Thomson, 1857

= Hammatoderus inermis =

Species of beetle

Hammatoderus inermis is a species of beetle in the family Cerambycidae. It was described by James Thomson in 1857. It is known from Nicaragua and Mexico.
