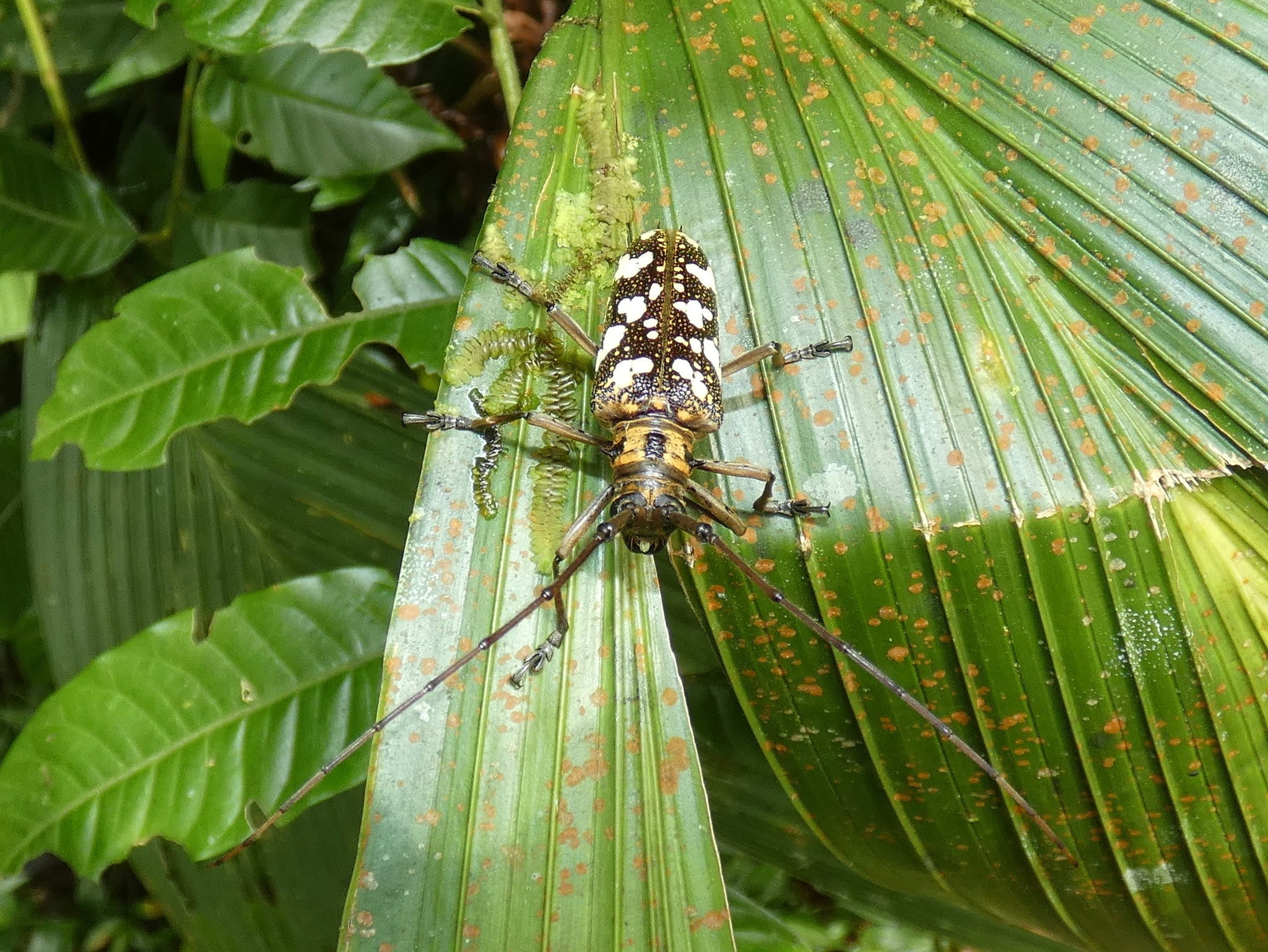

Scientific classification
- Kingdom: Animalia
- Phylum: Arthropoda
- Class: Insecta
- Order: Coleoptera
- Suborder: Polyphaga
- Infraorder: Cucujiformia
- Family: Cerambycidae
- Genus: Hammatoderus
- Species: H. emanon

Binomial name
- Hammatoderus emanon (Dillon & Dillon, 1941)

Synonyms
- Plagiohammus emanon Dillon & Dillon, 1941

= Hammatoderus emanon =

Species of beetle

Hammatoderus emanon is a species of beetle in the family Cerambycidae. It is known from Nicaragua, Costa Rica, and Panama. It was originally described by Dillon and Dillon in 1941 as Plagiohammus emanon, but later combined into the genus Hammatoderus, thus making the current binomial name Hammatoderus emanon.
