= Hammatoderus olivescens =

Scientific classification
- Domain: Eukaryota
- Kingdom: Animalia
- Phylum: Arthropoda
- Class: Insecta
- Order: Coleoptera
- Suborder: Polyphaga
- Infraorder: Cucujiformia
- Family: Cerambycidae
- Tribe: Lamiini
- Genus: Hammatoderus
- Species: H. olivescens

Binomial name
- Hammatoderus olivescens (Dillon & Dillon, 1941)

Synonyms
- Plagiohammus olivescens Dillon & Dillon, 1941

Species of beetle

Hammatoderus olivescens is a species of beetle in the family Cerambycidae. It was described by Dillon and Dillon in 1941. It is known from Mexico and Costa Rica.
