= Meroctenus =

Scientific classification
- Domain: Eukaryota
- Kingdom: Animalia
- Phylum: Arthropoda
- Class: Insecta
- Order: Coleoptera
- Suborder: Adephaga
- Family: Carabidae
- Subfamily: Harpalinae
- Tribe: Harpalini
- Genus: Meroctenus; Gemminger & Harold, 1868

Synonyms
- Paregaploa (G. Muller, 1947)

Genus of insects

Meroctenus is a genus of beetle in the family Carabidae first described by Gemminger & Harold in 1868.

== Species ==
Meroctenus contains the following ten species:

- Meroctenus crenulatus (Chaudoir, 1843)
- Meroctenus dabreui (Andrewes, 1924)
- Meroctenus exaratus (Dejean, 1829)
- Meroctenus mediocris (Andrewes, 1936)
- Meroctenus melanarius (Boheman, 1848)
- Meroctenus micans (Dejean, 1831)
- Meroctenus nigerianus Basilewsky, 1946
- Meroctenus penthicus (Jeannel, 1948)
- Meroctenus senegalensis (Dejean, 1829)
- Meroctenus usambaranus Basilewsky, 1948
