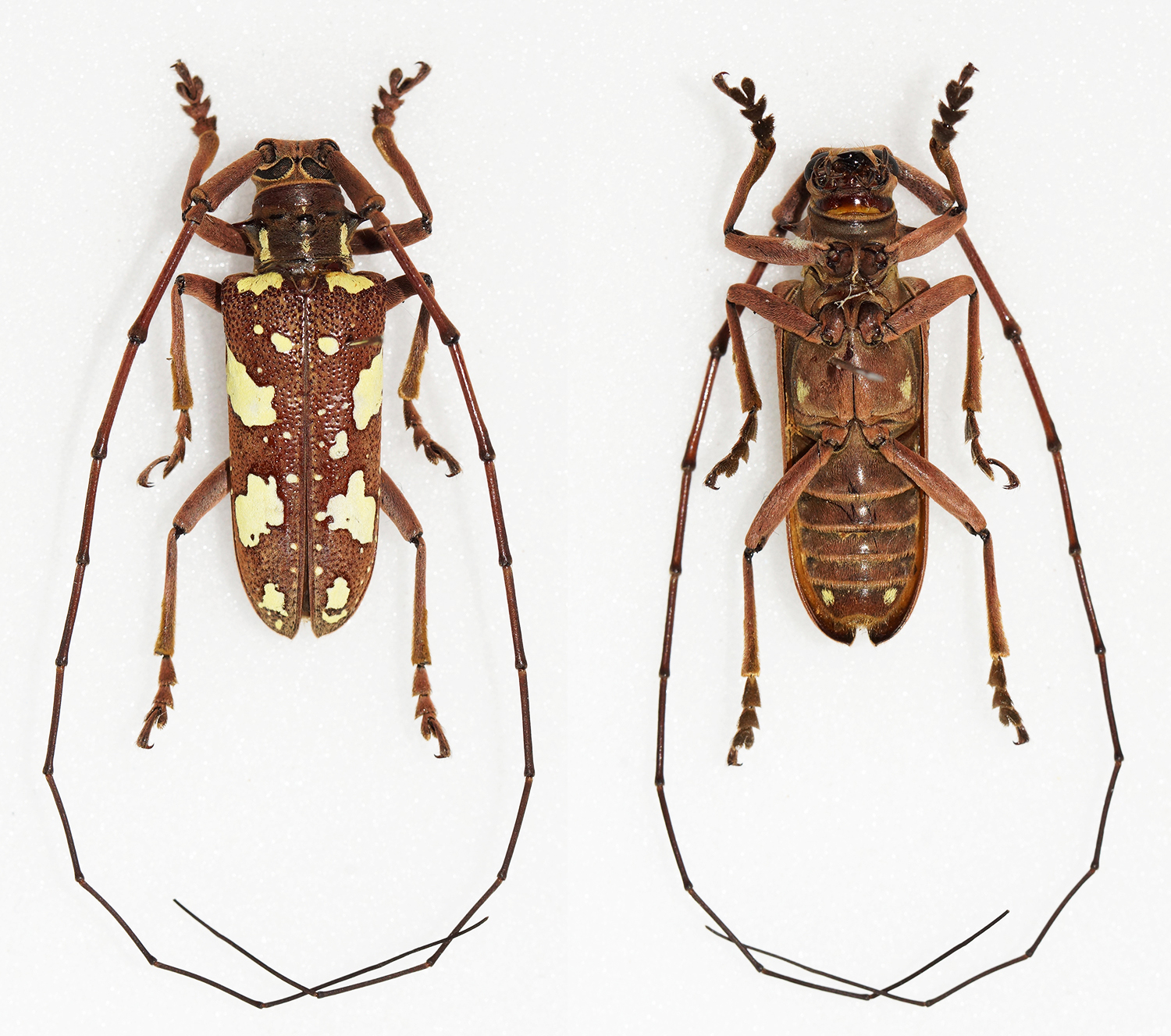

Scientific classification
- Domain: Eukaryota
- Kingdom: Animalia
- Phylum: Arthropoda
- Class: Insecta
- Order: Coleoptera
- Suborder: Polyphaga
- Infraorder: Cucujiformia
- Family: Cerambycidae
- Tribe: Lamiini
- Genus: Hammatoderus
- Species: H. maculosus

Binomial name
- Hammatoderus maculosus (Bates, 1880)

Synonyms
- Hammoderus maculosus Bates, 1880; Plagiohammus maculosus (Bates, 1880)

= Hammatoderus maculosus =

Species of beetle

Hammatoderus maculosus is a species of beetle in the family Cerambycidae. It was described by Henry Walter Bates in 1880. It is known from Guatemala, El Salvador, Mexico, Honduras, Belize, and Nicaragua.
