= Os opticus =

Bone found in the sclera of the eye in some bird species

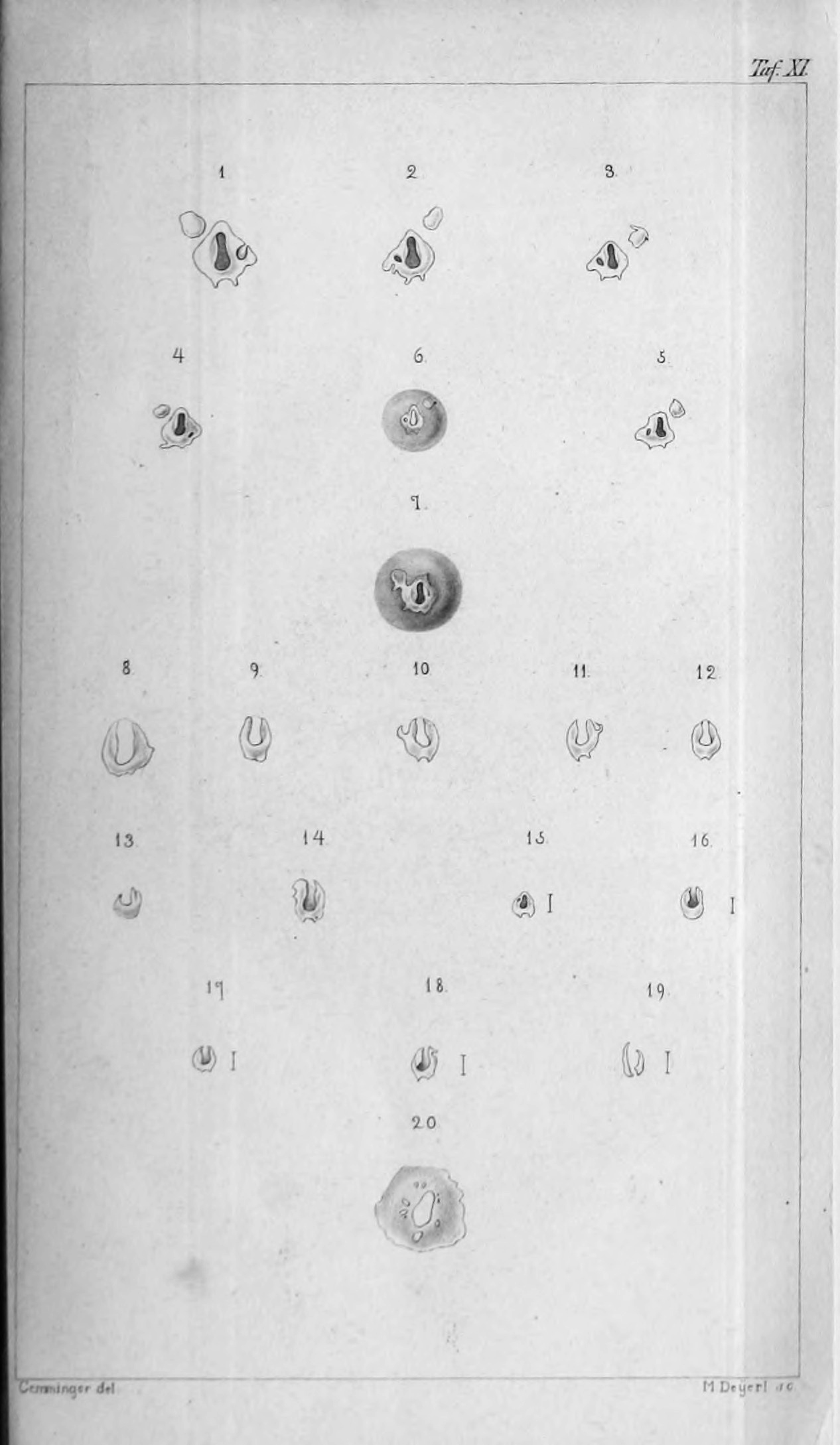
Os opticus, as illustrated in Plate XI of (Gemminger 1852). The items 1 to 6 shows some accessory bones not fused to the os opticus, and item 7, fused.

The os opticus, also known as os nervi optici or Gemminger's ossicle, is a bone found within the posterior sclera of the eye in many, but not all, species of birds. It is typically a ring- or horseshoe-shaped bone that encircles the optic nerve as it passes through the back of the eyeball. Its function is thought to be providing rigidity to the eye and supporting the optic nerve, which may be particularly important for birds that peck or require rapid visual accommodation. It was discovered by Max Gemminger in 1852.

== Anatomy ==
The bird eye is supported by a scleral ring at the front and a cartilaginous cup at the back. The os opticus is an ossification that forms in the cartilaginous cup, near where the optic nerve enters the eye.

Its shape is variable among species. It is commonly horseshoe-shaped, but can range from a complete circle in some woodpeckers (e.g., the red-headed woodpecker, Melanerpes erythrocephalus), to a short arc in the domestic chicken (Gallus). In birds like toucans, doves, and woodpeckers, small additional bones known as "accessory ossifications" or "small bony particles" can be found near the main os opticus.

Some birds possess other bones in the posterior sclera that form from the ossification of the scleral cartilage. These bones are only ever found in species that also have an os opticus. They are histologically similar to the os opticus, containing large marrow cavities filled with fat and blood cells. In birds studied during winter months, fat cells were observed to be predominant in these cavities. (Gemminger 1852) found such bones in the posterior sclera of 7 species of woodpeckers. In six of these species, these bones were not fused to the os opticus, while in one species they were.

In the English sparrow, the bone has a cancellous marrow cavity containing fatty tissue and blood vessels. In females, medullary bone forms in it, similar to the marrow cavity of the femur. It forms during ovarian follicle growth, and is reabsorbed during shell formation. See (Tiemeier 1953) for a description of its embryonic development in the English sparrow.

== Distribution ==
A 1950 study by Otto W. Tiemeier documented the os opticus in 219 species from 35 families of birds, including perching birds, woodpeckers, hummingbirds, toucans, kingfishers, and falcons. It is notably absent in ratites like the ostrich and emu, as well as in loons and grebes. This distribution suggests the trait evolved after the divergence of these older lineages from the common ancestor of other birds.

Even within species where it is present, its occurrence can be variable. In some species of Ardeidae (herons), Accipitridae (hawks and eagles), Phasianidae (pheasants and partridges), Columbidae (doves and pigeons), and Psittacidae (parrots), the bone is found in some individuals but is absent in others.

A similar but likely non-homologous structure has been found in the fossil placoderm fish Dunkleosteus.

== Function ==
The os opticus reinforces the posterior of the eyeball, making it more rigid. It is most highly developed in birds that obtain their food by pecking, such as woodpeckers, crows, and jays. The bone supports the optic nerve and may assist in rapid accommodation to near vision, an adaptation useful for these birds' feeding behaviors.

== See also ==
- Scleral ring
- Scleral cartilage
