= Medullary bone =

The medullary bone (MB) is a temporary anatomical structure found in most extant birds, and some extinct dinosaurs and birds. In female individuals during egg-laying period, bone tissue temporarily grows inside the medullary cavity from of the endosteal surface of bone shafts, and are reabsorbed by the end of the period. It is particularly prevalent in femurs, and can completely fill the medullary cavity during the peak. It co-occurs with capillary-rich red bone marrow, but not yellow bone marrow (adipose tissue). The MB contrast with the more permanent cortical bones. Histologically, it is a highly vascularized, mostly woven, endosteally-derived tissue.

When eggshell is formed, the speed at which calcium is absorbed in the bird's intestine is lower than the speed of calcium deposit in the oviduct, thus the bird must use a calcium reservoir within the body. Most of this is supplied by the MB, which is a much labile source of calcium than the cortical bones.

== History ==
It was first depicted in 1911 and later described in more detail in 1916 within a monograph on the comparative histology of the femur, in the femurs of yellowhammer and Pelecanus erythrorhynchus. It was forgotten and rediscovered by Kyes and Potter in 1934 in the pigeon femur, who found the basic physiological facts of it, that the occurrence of the MB is a cyclic event, restricted to female individuals, and coinciding with the maturation of the ovarian follicles. It had been most extensively studied in chickens, since egg-laying in hens is economically important.

== Distribution ==
Among extant amniotes, the MB is only found in birds. In particular, it is not found in non-avian reptiles such as crocodiles, snakes, and lizards.

=== In birds ===
In a systematic survey of 38 species of birds by μCT, the MB was found in all except Aethia pusilla and Strix varia, though the authors exclude them from the sample on the justification that they died at the end of the laying cycle, when the medullary bones would have been absorbed already. Most other birds have MB in femur and tibiotarsus. In Lonchura punctulata, MB is present in all bones except feet phalanges.

Being small, or being a diving flier, is positively correlated with having more MB and less air in bones. Being large or an efficient flier is positively correlated with having less MB and more air in bones. No correlation between the quantity and skeletal distribution of MB and body-size or clutch size, or whether the specimen lived and died in captivity vs the wild.

It does not exist in some species of Calidris. During egg-laying period, adult females' stomachs contain teeth and bones, especially vertebrae of Lemmus trimucronatus. They do not eat freshly dead lemmings, and their stomachs do not contain meat or fur of lemmings. They were hypothesized to eat from the cast pellets of avian predators of lemmings, especially Stercorarius pomarinus and Nyctea scandiaca.

=== Paleontology ===
The MB has been found in some dinosaurs, including Tyrannosaurus, Allosaurus, the ornithopod Tenontosaurus, and pterosaurs, though the putative MB tissue of Allosaurus may be pathologic, since pathological bone can also develop from the endosteal margin of the bone wall, and can look very similar to MB. It has also been found in some extinct birds, including Avimaia schweitzerae, Confuciusornis, and dodo. The presence of MB allows identifying individuals as females who died during egg-laying period. MB has been found in specimens of sub-adult size, which suggests that dinosaurs reached sexual maturity before they were full-grown. However, some hypothesize that the presence of MB in fossil only proves the individual had high calcium turnover rates, and not necessarily an egg-laying female.

The line of dinosaurs that includes Allosaurus and Tyrannosaurus diverged from the line that led to Tenontosaurus very early in the evolution of dinosaurs, but crocodiles, which are dinosaurs' second closest extant relatives after birds, do not have MB. This suggests that the MB may be a feature of Avemetatarsalia, and have first appeared in ornithodires, the Triassic archosaur group from which dinosaurs are thought to have evolved.

See also.

== Physiology ==
=== Histology ===
The MB is a granular or powdery soft, fine network of woven-type trabecular bone, in contrast with cortical bone and cancellous bone, which are both hard. It can be separated from the rest of the bone by scraping or by careful grinding and sieving. The presence of MB in a femur can be checked by putting the femur in front of a bright light. Increasing amount of MB decreases the translucency of the bone.

Microstructurally, the mineral particles are smaller in MB than in cortical bones. During eggshell calcification, the mineral content and the size of trabeculae of MB decrease markedly, and the smaller mineral particles are preferentially removed.

=== Endocrinology ===
The MB is not found in males. It is also not found in female chickens before sexual maturity.

The MB forms under the influence of testosterone and estrogen. It can be induced by injecting estradiol dipropionate in female pigeons, and injecting estradiol valerate in normal male Japanese quails, and injecting both estradiol and testosterone propionate in castrated male pigeons (injecting only estradiol is ineffective).

Curiously, high-dose estrogen injection also causes femurs of mice to become completely filled with bone tissue. This is unique in mice among mammals.

=== Skeletal distribution ===
Generally, the amount of MB deposited in bird limbs follows a consistent pattern across species. Each limb (wing or leg) is such that the proximal part (closest to the torso) may contain air, followed by a part containing red marrow and MB, followed by a part containing yellow marrow. Once MB ends, the rest of the limb is filled with only yellow marrow. For example, in Cygnus atratus, MB ends in the middle of tibiotarsus, so its tarsometatarsus contains only yellow marrow. In Alisterus chloropterus, MB exists in tarsometatarsus, so its tibiotarsus contains only MB.

Birds inherited skeletal pneumaticity from their ancestors. Pneumaticity in bones behind the cranium results from the progressive invasion of bones by diverticula of the pulmonary air sac system after hatching. As these diverticula invade the medullary cavity of bones, there is a simultaneous relocation and decrease in red marrow content, which prevents the formation of MB later during reproductive cycles. In some cases, air sac diverticula do no completely invade the cavities of pneumatized skeletal elements, so small amounts of bone marrow, and hence MB, can persist.

Within a species, different individuals even of the same age can differ in how much the air sac diverticula invade the cavities of skeletal elements, and thus how much red bone marrow can remain. This could explain intraspecific variation in MB. MB was even present in very small bones, such as the ribs of some small passerine birds like Lonchura punctulata, or the bones of the hummingbird Phaethornis superciliosus, or the tiny os opticus of the Passer domesticus.

Other patterns of MB are:

- When present in the skull, MB was always found in the pterygoid and/or surangular.
- When present in the caudal sacrum, it is also present in the pygostyle.
- When present in one cervical vertebra, it is also present in the ones closer to the head. For example, if it is present in the axis, then it is also present in the atlas.
- MB is positively correlated with red bone marrow.
- Pneumatic bones lack blood vessels, and have no or only small amounts of MB.
- If a bone is paired on the left and right side, then the amount of MB present in both are similar.

== Calcium metabolism ==
The function of MB is to allow the specialized form of calcium metabolism in birds. Most research on calcium metabolism in birds is in chickens, because of their economic importance. Thus, in this section, we default to describing the calcium metabolism of the chicken.

The MB first occurs in a pullet about 10 to 14 days before she comes into lay, at the same time when she starts secreting extra sex hormones and retain extra calcium and phosphate. The MB grows in synchrony with the growth of follicles in the ovary, and is mostly absorbed as the egg leaves the ovary, pass down the oviduct, and have eggshell deposited on it. During the buildup of MB, there is great activity of the osteoblast. During the reabsorption of MB, there is great activity of the osteoclast.

MB in pigeons during follicular cycle
| Size of follicles (mm) | State of MB |
|---|---|
| <2 | None |
| >4.5 | Some |
| 10 | Extreme |

The "shell gland" in the oviduct of the egg-laying chicken can secret about 5 g of calcium carbonate within 20 hours. In an egg-laying chicken, there is about 0.5 M of calcium, 98% of which is in the medullary and cortical bone. The cost of laying eggs is 0.05 M/day. "an egg-laying chicken on a low calcium diet has a constant mass of medullary bone after laying 6 eggs, but consistently loses about 5 g of mass in cortical bone per egg. After laying 6 eggs, 40% of cortical mass is lost.

During eggshell formation or pregnancy, a female animal requires calcium to form the eggshell or the embryo bones. In most mammals, and the turtles, the rate of calcium consumption and bone reabsorption are both in the range of 1–5 mg Ca/kg body weight/hr. This is true even in cows, though cows are unusual among mammals in that their colostrum is significantly more enriched in calcium than subsequent milk, so bone reabsorption may become insufficient after parturition, resulting in milk fever. In contrast, in the chicken, consumption is ~40 and bone reabsorption is ~25. The MB makes up for this serious shortfall. The medullary bone can be mobilized at a rate of 10–15× faster than cortical bone, and 2× as fast as epiphysis, making it the most labile source of calcium in the bird.

During development, the Ca content of a chicken embryo grows exponentially. A fully developed chicken embryo contains 125 mg of Ca, of which 100 mg comes from the shell. The entire shell contains about 2000 mg of Ca. .

In hens, much of the shell is formed during the night, when generally no Ca is consumed and when the Ca content of the digestive tract is gradually decreasing, thus during this time Ca is mostly coming from bones. If the hen during an egg-laying period is on a high-Ca diet, it can replenish all Ca lost to the previous egg during the interval between two eggs. Otherwise, the hen gradually loses cortical bone tissue, but the amount of MB tissue remains fairly constant.
