= Hammatoderus sallei =

Scientific classification
- Domain: Eukaryota
- Kingdom: Animalia
- Phylum: Arthropoda
- Class: Insecta
- Order: Coleoptera
- Suborder: Polyphaga
- Infraorder: Cucujiformia
- Family: Cerambycidae
- Tribe: Lamiini
- Genus: Hammatoderus
- Species: H. sallei

Binomial name
- Hammatoderus sallei (Thomson, 1860)

Synonyms
- Hammoderus sallei Thomson, 1861; Plagiohammus sallei (Thomson, 1860)

Species of beetle

Hammatoderus sallei is a species of beetle in the family Cerambycidae. It was described by James Thomson in 1860. It is known from Mexico.
