= Hammatoderus lacordairei =

Scientific classification
- Domain: Eukaryota
- Kingdom: Animalia
- Phylum: Arthropoda
- Class: Insecta
- Order: Coleoptera
- Suborder: Polyphaga
- Infraorder: Cucujiformia
- Family: Cerambycidae
- Tribe: Lamiini
- Genus: Hammatoderus
- Species: H. lacordairei

Binomial name
- Hammatoderus lacordairei (Thomson, 1860)

Synonyms
- Hammoderus lacordairei Thomson, 1861; Plagiohammus lacordairei (Thomson, 1860)

Species of beetle

Hammatoderus lacordairei is a species of beetle in the family Cerambycidae. It was described by James Thomson in 1860. It is known from Panama and Mexico.
