= Max Gemminger =

German entomologist (1820–1887)

Max Gemminger (22 January 1820 – 18 April 1887) was a German medical doctor, anatomist, zoologist and a curator at Royal Bavarian museum in Munich. He published a major catalogue of the beetles in the collections along with Baron Edgar von Harold, describing a number of taxa. He also worked on fish biology and collaborated with other zoologists of the period.

Gemminger was born in Munich and went to a Latin school in Regensburg and from 1834 at Munich. He went to the Ludwig-Maximilians-Universität München where he received a doctorate in medicine. His 1847 dissertation was on the electric organs of the Mormyrus. He described four bones dorsal and ventral to the electric organ that were named later as "Gemminger bones" while a horseshoe shaped bone around the optic nerve of birds has been termed as "Gemminger ossicles" or os opticus. He then became the head of a municipal museum in Trieste. In 1849, he moved to the museum in Munich instigated by his former doctoral advisor, the embryologist Michael Pius Erdl (1815–1848) to work under the director Andreas Wagner. In 1864, he became an assistant to Carl Theodor von Siebold. From 1886, Gemminger worked on the beetle collections and produced a 12 volume catalog, Catalogus coleopterorum hucusque descriptorum synonymicus et systematicus, along with Baron Edgar von Harold over the course of 30 years. The work dealt with more than 77,000 species. He continued his studies on fish biology and was involved in the introduction of Lucioperca sandra to Lake Starnberg.

Gemminger was a member of the Regensburg Zoological-Mineralogical Society, the "Lotos" society of Prague as well as the entomological society of Stettin.
