= 1964 in science =

The year 1964 in science and technology involved some significant events, listed below.

== Astronomy and space exploration ==
- January 30 – The Soviet Union launches the first Elektron satellites.
- Spring – First recognition of cosmic microwave background radiation as a detectable phenomenon, securing the Big Bang as the best theory of the origin and evolution of the universe.
- March 20 – The precursor of the European Space Agency, ESRO (European Space Research Organization) is established (under an agreement of June 14, 1962).
- July 31 – Ranger program: Ranger 7 sends back the first close-up photographs of the Moon; images are 1,000 times clearer than anything ever seen from Earth-bound telescopes.
- October 12 – The Soviet Union launches the Voskhod 1 into Earth orbit as the first spacecraft with a multi-person crew and the first flight without space suits (the crew wouldn't fit in the space capsule otherwise).

== Biology ==
- British molecular biologist Robin Holliday proposes existence of the Holliday junction in nucleic acid.

== Computer science ==
- April 7 – IBM announces the System/360, in six models with 32-bit architecture.
- May 1 – John George Kemeny and Thomas Eugene Kurtz run the first program created in BASIC (Beginners' All-purpose Symbolic Instruction Code), an easy to learn high level programming language that will eventually be included on many computers and even some games consoles.
- PL/I (Programming Language I), a block-structured computer language, is created by George Radin, while at IBM.
- Programma 101 is announced at the World's Fair. Invented by the Italian engineer Pier Giorgio Perotto, It is one of the first commercial desktop programmable calculators.

== Earth sciences ==
- March 27 (Good Friday) – Great Alaskan earthquake, the second most powerful known, with a magnitude of 9.2.
- Swiss geologist Augusto Gansser publishes Geology of the Himalayas.

== History of science and technology ==
- January 23 – The Smithsonian Institution's Museum of History and Technology opens to the public in Washington, D.C.

== Mathematics ==
- Paul Cohen proves the independence of the continuum hypothesis.
- Jacques Tits publishes significant work on group theory.

== Paleontology ==
- August – John Ostrom identifies remains of the dinosaur Deinonychus in Montana, significant in being a small, agile species closely related to the birds.

== Physics ==
- Three papers are published by Robert Brout and François Englert, Peter Higgs, and Gerald Guralnik, Dick Hagen, and Tom Kibble, predicting the Higgs boson and Higgs mechanism (or Englert–Brout–Higgs–Guralnik–Hagen–Kibble mechanism) which provides the means by which gauge bosons can acquire non-zero masses in the process of spontaneous symmetry breaking. As part of Physical Review Letters' 50th anniversary celebration, the journal will recognize each of these contributions as milestone papers in its history.
- Existence of the charm quark is speculated by James Bjorken and Sheldon Glashow.
- John Stewart Bell publishes a paper on the EPR paradox originating Bell's theorem.
- James Cronin, Val Fitch and coworkers provided clear evidence from kaon decay is a CP violation.

== Physiology and medicine ==
- January 11 – U.S. Surgeon General Luther Terry reports that smoking may be hazardous to health in the first such statement from the Federal government of the United States.
- January 16 – First angioplasty carried out, on the superficial femoral artery by U.S. interventional radiologist Charles Dotter.
- January 23 – First heart transplantation on a human, using a chimpanzee heart, carried out by U.S. surgeon James D. Hardy on Boyd Rush, but the organ is rejected after a few hours.
- March 28 – The Epstein-Barr virus is first described, by Anthony Epstein, Bert Achong and Yvonne Barr in London.
- June 27 – Iain Macintyre's group reports it has isolated and sequenced the newly discovered hormone calcitonin and demonstrates its origin in the parafollicular cells of the thyroid gland.
- Jerome Horwitz synthesizes zidovudine (AZT), an antiviral drug that will come to be used in treating HIV.
- Temazepam first synthesized.
- Lesch–Nyhan syndrome is first described, by Drs Michael Lesch and William Nyhan.
- Fernando Alves Martins of Portugal applies optical fiber technology to a gastrocamera to produce the first such device with a flexible fiberscope, for use in esophagogastroduodenoscopy.

== Psychology ==
- Publication of Eric Berne's book Games People Play: The Psychology of Human Relationships in the United States.

== Technology ==
- October – Dr. Robert Moog demonstrates his prototype synthesizers.
- Farrington Daniels' book Direct Use of the Sun's Energy is published.

== Publications ==
- Science Citation Index begins publication.

== Awards ==
- Nobel Prizes
  - Physics – Charles Hard Townes, Nicolay Gennadiyevich Basov, Aleksandr Prokhorov
  - Chemistry – Dorothy Crowfoot Hodgkin
  - Medicine – Konrad Bloch, Feodor Lynen

== Births ==
- January 2 – Michael J. Horowitz, American electrical engineer.
- March 5 – Yoshua Bengio, French-born Canadian computer scientist.
- June 5 – Dukagjin Pupovci, Kosovo Albanian professor
- February 19 – Jennifer Doudna, American biochemist.
- August 25 – Maxim Kontsevich, Russian mathematician.
- Gillian Reid, Scottish-born inorganic chemist

== Deaths ==
- February 5 – Matilde E. Moisant (born 1878), American pioneer aviator.
- February 20 – Verena Holmes (born 1889), English mechanical engineer and inventor.
- April 14 – Tatiana Ehrenfest-Afanaseva (born 1876), Russian-born Dutch mathematician.
- April 24 – Gerhard Domagk (born 1895), German pathologist and bacteriologist, winner of the Nobel Prize in Physiology or Medicine.
- May 30 – Leó Szilárd (born 1898), Hungarian-American physicist.
- June 7 – Arthur O. Austin (born 1879), American electrical engineer.
- October – Guy Stewart Callendar (born 1898), English thermodynamic engineer and climatologist.
- December 1 – J. B. S. Haldane (born 1892), British geneticist.
- December 17 – Victor Franz Hess (born 1883), American physicist.
- December 30 – Hans Gerhard Creutzfeldt (born 1885), German neuropathologist.
