= Cranial neural crest =

Details

Identifiers
- Latin: crista neuralis cranialis
- TE: neural crest_by_E5.15.1.0.2.0.1 E5.15.1.0.2.0.1

The cranial neural crest is one of the four regions of the neural crest.

The cranial neural crest arises in the anterior and populates the face and the pharyngeal arches giving rise to bones, cartilage, nerves and connective tissue. The endocranium and facial bones of the skull are ultimately derived from crest cells.

Other Migration Locations:
- Into the pharyngeal arches and play an inductive role in thymus development.
- Into the pharyngeal arches and form the parafollicular cell or ultimobranchial bodies of the thyroid gland.
- Into the pharyngeal arches and play an inductive role in parathyroid gland development.
- Facial ectomesenchyme of the pharyngeal arches forming skeletal muscle, bone, and cartilage in the face.
- Odontoblasts (dentin-producing cells) of the teeth.
- Around the optic vesicle and the developing eye and contributes to many eye elements such the choroid, sclera, iris, and ciliary body. It also contributes to the attaching skeletal muscles of the eye.
- Into the otic placode and participates in the inner ear development.
- Sensory ganglia of the fifth, seventh, ninth and tenth cranial nerves.
- Schwann cells
