= International Bone and Mineral Society =

Learned society in the field of bone and mineral metabolism

- Abbreviation: IBMS
- Established: 1980; 46 years ago
- Founded at: Quebec, Canada
- Defunct: 2017; 9 years ago?
- Type: Unincorporated association
- Purpose: Field of bone metabolism
- Location: Chicago, Illinois, US
- Region served: International
- Website: www.ibmsonline.org
- Remarks: Appears to have ceased activity in 2017
- Formerly called: International Conferences on Calcium Regulating Hormones (ICCRH)

The International Bone and Mineral Society (IBMS), formerly International Conferences on Calcium Regulating Hormones, is or was a learned society in the field of bone and mineral metabolism. There is no indication of activities or publications by the society since 2017.

== History ==
The International Bone and Mineral Society has its origins in the Parathyroid Conferences, a triennial event run from 1960 to 1977. The conferences started off focusing on the biology related to parathyroid hormones and calcitonin, but widened the scope to match participants' interests, and began covering osteoporosis, vitamin D, and the cellular and molecular biology of bone.

In 1980, the group was incorporated in Quebec, Canada, under the name International Conferences on Calcium Regulating Hormones (ICCRH). The organization's rules were changed to make international representation on the board mandatory, thus becoming the only truly international society in the field.

In 1995, at a meeting in Melbourne, Australia, co-hosted by the Australian and New Zealand Bone and Mineral Society (ANZBMS), the name was changed to International Bone and Mineral Society (IBMS). and it was registered as a 501(c)(3) organization with headquarters in Washington, D.C., United States.

At each conference and joint meeting, participant numbers grew. Joint meetings included:

- American Society for Bone and Mineral Research (from 1989)
- Australia and New Zealand Bone and Mineral Society (from 1995)
- European Calcified Tissue Society (from 2001)
- Japanese Bone and Mineral Society (from 2003)

== Purpose and activities ==
The mission of IBMS is "to facilitate the generation and dissemination of knowledge of bone and mineral metabolism through communication, community, training, and multi-disciplinary meetings throughout the world".

It holds annual scientific meetings produces a scientific website and journal.

=== Meetings and workshops ===
IBMS rotated its meetings among North America, Europe, and the Pacific region.

From 2008, it organized the international Sun Valley workshop (on skeletal biology, held in Sun Valley, Idaho). It also organized the biennial International Conference on Osteoporosis and Bone Disease, held in China, in collaboration with the International Chinese Hard Tissue Society and the Chinese Society of Osteoporosis and Bone and Mineral Research.

The second joint meeting of IBMS and ANZBMS was held in Sydney, Australia, in March 2009. A joint meeting was again held in Brisbane in June 2017.

The 2nd Herbert Fleisch Workshop was held in Bruges, Belgium in February 2016. The purpose of this event was to Gordon Conference style of forum for students, post-doctoral researchers, and early stage principal investigators to present their work, network with colleagues, and obtain feedback from scientists experienced in the field.

=== Publications ===
Two scientific journals, Bone and Bone and Mineral merged under the title Bone, which became the official journal of IBMS, published monthly, until the relationship between the journal and IBMS ended on 31 December 2012. The journal Bone went on to become a leading journal in the field.

IBMS started publishing IBMS BoneKEy in 2001 as an online open-access knowledge environment. Since 2011, Nature Publishing Group has published IBMS BoneKEy on behalf of the society. BoneKEy Reports is the official online journal of the society. Published online only, it started publishing original research in January 2013. There is free public access to issues between 2012 and 2017, when it appears to have ceased publication.

== Members ==
As of 2013, ANZBMS was an affiliate member of IBMS.

== Location ==
The last known location of IBMS is 330 N. Wabash, Suite 1900, Chicago, IL 60611.

== Awards ==
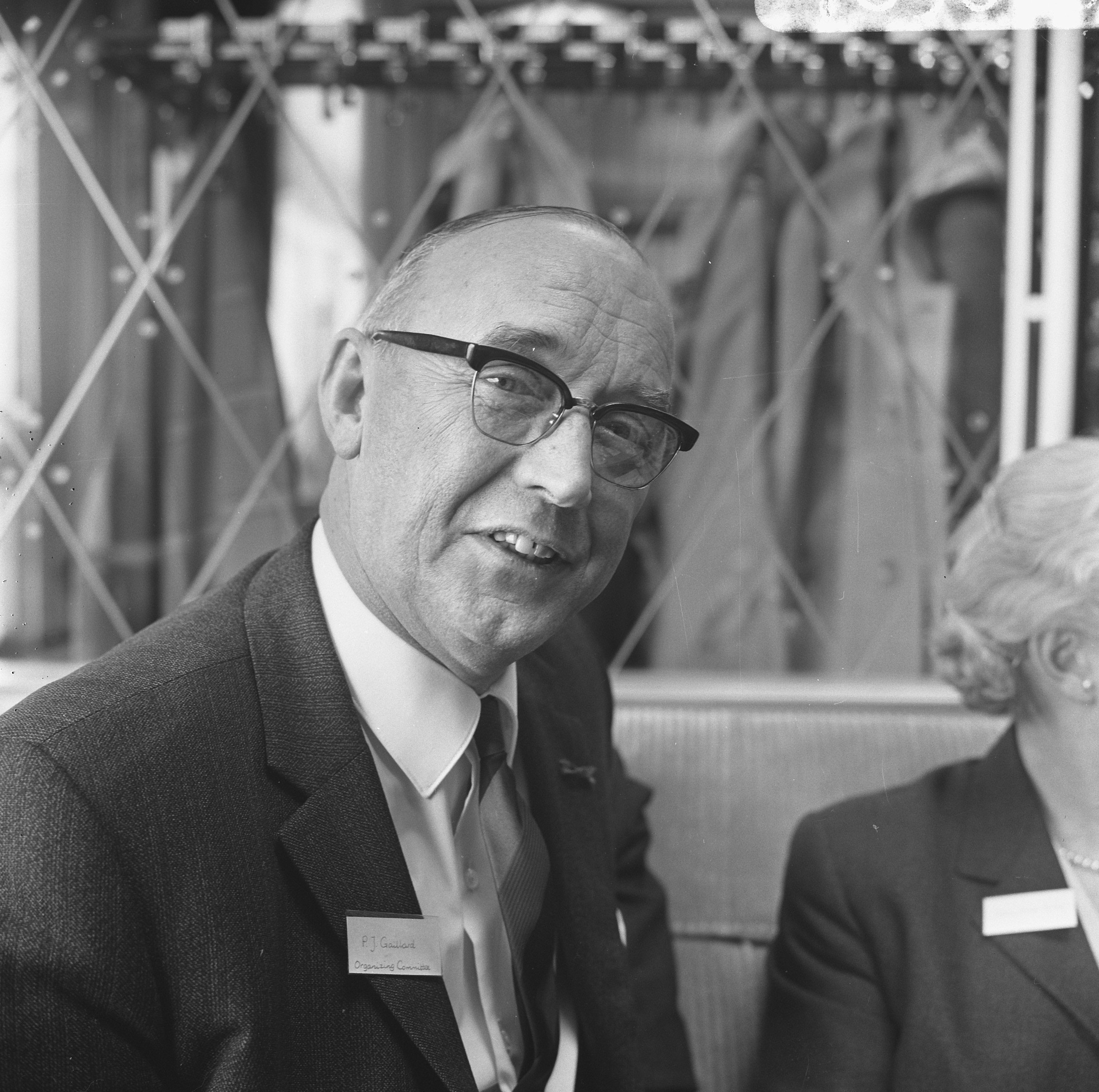
Pieter Johannes Gaillard (1907–1992)

IBMS has in the past awarded a number of series of awards. These include the following.

- IBMS Elsevier Award, "for outstanding research and teaching throughout their career by an IBMS member in the fields of bone and mineral metabolism" (awarded 1989, 1992, 1995, 1998, 2001, 2003, 2005, 2007; in partnership with Elsevier)
  - Recipients include British endocrinologist Iain Macintyre (1924–2008), who won the award in 1992.
- IBMS John G. Haddad Jr. Award, "for outstanding contributions by an IBMS member to clinical research in bone and mineral metabolism, that have led to significant changes in understanding of physiology or disease, or to changes in disease management or prevention" (first awarded 1998, then biennially between 2001 and 2009)
  - In honour of John G. Haddad Jr, an American doctor who created pioneering research into vitamin D metabolism, and was a president of the American Society for Bone and Mineral Research
- Peter Gaillard IBMS Founder's Award, "in recognition of outstanding contributions, leadership and dedicated service to the International Bone and Mineral Society and the field of bone and mineral research"(a biennial award, awarded between 2001 and 2009)
  - In honour of Pieter Johannes Gaillard (1907–1992), Dutch scientist, emeritus professor in cell biology and histology at the Faculty of Medicine at Leiden University
- D. Harold Copp Award, "for outstanding achievements by an IBMS member in basic research in the fields of bone and mineral metabolism that have led to significant changes in understanding of physiology or disease" (a biennial award, awarded between 2001 and 2009)
  - In honour of Douglas Harold Copp (1915–1998), a Canadian scientist who discovered and named the hormone calcitonin, which is used in the treatment of bone disease
- IBMS Herbert A. Fleisch Award, for "outstanding achievement by an IBMS Member aged 45 years or younger...in the field of bone and mineral research" (only awarded in 2009)
  - In honour of Herbert Andre Fleisch (1933–2007), a Swiss scientist, academic, mentor and teacher (Note: Fleisch was also honoured by the naming of a medal after him, by the International Osteoporosis Foundation, awarded annually since 2011.)
