= Australian and New Zealand Bone and Mineral Society =

- Abbreviation: ANZBMS
- Predecessor: Series of bone research symposia
- Formation: 1988
- Founder: Professor Thomas John (Jack) Martin
- Purpose: Principal professional body for scientists and clinicians involved in bone and mineral metabolism research in Australia and New Zealand
- Region served: Australia and New Zealand
- Services: Bone research
- Members: Over 500
- Key people: Sol Posen, Roger Melick, Christopher and Margie Nordin
- Affiliations: International Congress on Calcium Regulating Hormones, International Osteoporosis Foundation, Japanese Society for Bone and Mineral Research
- Disbursements: Several grants and awards

The Australian and New Zealand Bone and Mineral Society (ANZBMS) is a not-for-profit collegiate organisation and principal professional body for scientists and clinicians involved in bone and mineral metabolism research in Australia and New Zealand.

Since its inception in 1988, the ANZBMS has become one of the premier bone research societies in Australia, with its members recognised for their outstanding contributions made to clinical and biomedical musculoskeletal research. The ANZBMS continues to act as a policy advisor to governments and the community throughout Australasia on issues such as clinical bone disease and funding for musculoskeletal research.

== Aims and purpose of the Society ==
The ANZBMS aims to develop and share new knowledge about bone and mineral metabolism, with particular emphasis on issues of clinical relevance. It also aims to promote bone and mineral research, integrate clinical and basic science, and apply research findings to health care. The society also works to educate clinicians, allied health professionals and the public about the nature and management of diseases affecting the skeleton.

== History ==
The ANZBMS developed from a series of bone research symposia held in the late 1970s and early 1980s throughout Australia and New Zealand, which eventually led to the founding of the society at the Auckland Bone Symposium in 1988, with Professor Thomas John (Jack) Martin as its inaugural president. The first annual meeting was held in Perth in 1990. Since then, the society has continued to hold successful scientific meetings on an annual basis, with a focus on biomedical and clinical research in musculoskeletal biology and disease.

Over the last decade, the ANZBMS membership has grown continuously and is now over 500. The ANZBMS maintains regular contact with its members through its website and e-newsletters. A strategic plan, drafted by ANZBMS Council in 2006, aimed to enhance membership involvement and implement initiatives to encourage young investigators to pursue careers in bone and mineral research. The ANZBMS has developed, and strongly supports, advocacy initiatives to facilitate increased funding for bone research from governmental and non-governmental sources in both Australia and New Zealand. Members of the society actively address clinical and basic science issues and take leadership roles in identifying, defining and then developing strategic plans to address key problems in basic and clinical musculoskeletal science.

== National and international collaboration ==
The ANZBMS liaises extensively with other international societies with shared interests. The first joint meeting with the International Congress on Calcium Regulating Hormones (later to become the International Bone and Mineral Society or IBMS) was held in Melbourne in 1995. This relationship was further strengthened with the 2000 International Bone and Hormone Meeting held on Hamilton Island and the 2007 joint meeting in Sydney. In 1999, the ANZBMS joined the Committee of National Societies of the International Osteoporosis Foundation (IOF).

In 2011, the ANZBMS hosted the 2nd IOF Asia-Pacific Osteoporosis and Bone Meeting, a high calibre scientific event held in conjunction with the Japanese Society for Bone and Mineral Research. In 2012, the ANZBMS became the third society to establish a firm partnership with the International Bone and Mineral Society, facilitating scientific collaboration and open access to the BoneKey knowledge environment. Other member societies of IBMS are the Spanish Research Society for Bone and Mineral Metabolism (SEIOMM) and the Japanese Society for Bone and Mineral Research (JSBMR).

The ANZBMS maintains close links to Osteoporosis Australia, a not-for-profit organisation that is the main consumer body in the bone area in Australia.

== ANZBMS Council ==
A democratically elected council governs the affairs of ANZBMS. The council consists of the president, immediate past president, president elect, treasurer, secretary and further members from New Zealand and each Australian state. View current and past council members.

== Education ==
The ANZBMS organises and runs high quality scientific meetings to fulfill the educational and collaborative needs of researchers and clinicians working in bone diseases across Australia, New Zealand and internationally.

In addition to its Annual Scientific Meeting, the Society runs a number of educational and training courses. The first ANZBMS Bone Densitometry Course was held in Sydney in 2001, providing a high quality accreditation programme that quickly became an integral annual part of the Society's educational programme. The ANZBMS Advanced Clinical Postgraduate Meetings in Bone Disease, held biannually across Australia and New Zealand, focuses on clinical aspects of musculoskeletal biology and disease and targets younger members of the scientific and clinical community.

== Awards ==
In 2002, an AU$15,000 travel grant was created by the ANZBMS in memory of Christine Martin and to honour the scientific contributions of Professor Jack Martin. This grant facilitates the travel of ANZBMS members to undertake bone and mineral research in any aspect of basic or clinical science.

The ANZBMS also offers several other grants and awards that recognise the high standard of bone and mineral research and promote education. These include the Sol Posen Research Award, the Roger Melick Young Investigator Award, the Christopher and Margie Nordin Young Investigator Poster Award, the Kaye Ibbertson Award for Bone and Mineral Medicine, the ANZBMS Career Achievement Award and, in conjunction with Osteoporosis Australia, the Philip Sambrook Award. These and a number of other (travel) awards are available to financial members of ANZBMS.

== See also ==
- International Bone and Mineral Society
- American Society for Bone and Mineral Research
- International Osteoporosis Foundation
- Osteoporosis
