= Iain Macintyre =

British endocrinologist

Iain Macintyre FRS
- Born: Iain Macintyre; 30 August 1924; Glasgow, Scotland
- Died: 18 September 2008 (aged 84); London, England
- Education: Jordanhill College School; University of Glasgow
- Occupation: Professor of Chemical Pathology
- Known for: Research into calcium metabolism Sequencing of calcitonin Research into nitric oxide
- Awards: Gairdner International Award; Buchanan medal
- Workplaces: Royal Postgraduate Medical School, London; William Harvey Research Institute, London

Iain Macintyre FRS (30 August 1924 – 18 September 2008) was a British endocrinologist who made important contributions to the understanding of calcium regulation and bone metabolism. Shortly after the hormone calcitonin had been described by Harold Copp, Macintyre's team was the first to isolate and sequence the hormone and to demonstrate its origin in the parafollicular cells of the thyroid gland. He subsequently analysed its physiological actions. Along with H. R. Morris he isolated and sequenced calcitonin gene-related peptide. Later research centred on the role played by nitric oxide on bone metabolism.

== Early life and education ==
Macintyre was born in Glasgow on 30 August 1924, the eldest son of John Macintyre and Margaret (née Shaw). He went to school at Jordanhill College School (subsequently Jordanhill School), Glasgow, passing out as joint dux.

He entered the University of Glasgow to study medicine and graduated MBChB in 1947.

== Career ==
After house posts in Glasgow, Macintyre began as a trainee pathologist in Sheffield, which involved working as a demonstrator in the laboratory of Dr (later Sir) Hans Krebs, the future Nobel laureate. His contact with Krebs would influence his career choice in chemical pathology.

He joined the chemical pathology department at the Royal Postgraduate Medical School, at the Hammersmith Hospital in London as a registrar. In 1954 he became the Sir Jack Drummond Memorial Fellow, which enabled him to embark on a career of research in biochemistry, initially under the mentorship of Professor Earl King.

He designed and constructed a flame photometer that enabled very accurate measurements of blood calcium and magnesium levels. This led to studies of magnesium deficiency. Shortly after Douglas Harold Copp's discovery of the hormone calcitonin, Macintyre's group demonstrated that the hormone was produced in the parafollicular cells of the thyroid rather than the parathyroid gland as suggested by Copp. In 1967 the Gardner International Award was made jointly to Copp and Macintyre for their work on the origin and existence of calcitonin. Macintyre's laboratory also purified and then sequenced both porcine calcitonin and human calcitonin. His team also demonstrated calcitonin gene-related peptide, which they went on to sequence and then characterise.

A major contribution to education during Macintyre's time at the Hammersmith Hospital was the organisation of international endocrinology conferences held every two years between 1967 and 1981. These were attended by leading workers in the field of endocrinology from around the world.

He was promoted to the chair of endocrine chemistry and chemical pathology in 1967, and in 1982 was appointed director of the Wellcome Endocrine Unit based at Hammersmith Hospital. The research interest expanded into the role of vitamin D in bone metabolism.

On retiring from the Hammersmith Hospital, Macintyre became research director at the William Harvey Research Institute of the University of London. There his research centred on the role of nitric oxide in bone metabolism.

== Awards and honours ==
In 1967 MacIntyre was awarded (jointly) the Canada Gairdner International Award.

He was the recipient of the IBMS Elsevier Award at the XIth ICCRH Conference in Florence in 1992. This award is given to "for outstanding research and teaching throughout their career by an IBMS member in the fields of bone and mineral metabolism".

He was elected a Fellow of the Royal Society in 1996, which awarded him the Buchanan Medal in 2006.

== Family ==
Macintyre married Mabel (Mabs) Wilson Jamieson, on 14 July 1947 in the Chapel of the University of Glasgow. She died in 2003. They had one daughter, Fiona Bell Macintyre.

He died in London on 18 September 2008.
