= Sigma =

Eighteenth letter of the Greek alphabet

Sigma (/ˈsɪɡmə/ SIG-mə; uppercase Σ, lowercase σ, lowercase in word-final position ς; Greek: σίγμα) is the eighteenth letter of the Greek alphabet. When it is used at the end of a letter-case word (one that does not use all caps), the final form (ς) is used. In Ὀδυσσεύς (Odysseus), for example, the two lowercase sigmas (σ) in the center of the name are distinct from the word-final sigma (ς) at the end.

In the system of Greek numerals, sigma has a value of 200. In general mathematics, Σ is used as an operator for summation. The Latin letter S derives from sigma while the Cyrillic letter Es (С) derives from a lunate form of this letter.

== History ==
The shape (Σς) and alphabetic position of sigma is derived from the Phoenician letter shin (𐤔).

Sigma's original name may have been san, but due to the complicated early history of the Greek epichoric alphabets, san came to be identified as a separate letter in the Greek alphabet, represented as Ϻ. Herodotus reports that "san" was the name given by the Dorians to the same letter called "sigma" by the Ionians. (Note: "the same letter, which the Dorians call "san", but the Ionians 'sigma'..." [translated from Ancient Greek: "τὠυτὸ γράμμα, τὸ Δωριέες μὲν σὰν καλέουσι ,Ἴωνες δὲ σίγμα"] (Herodotus 1.139))

According to one hypothesis, the name "sigma" may continue that of Phoenician samekh (𐤎), the letter continued through Greek xi, represented as Ξ. Alternatively, the name may have been a Greek innovation that simply meant 'hissing', from the root of σίζω (sízō, from Proto-Greek *sig-jō 'I hiss').

=== Lunate sigma ===
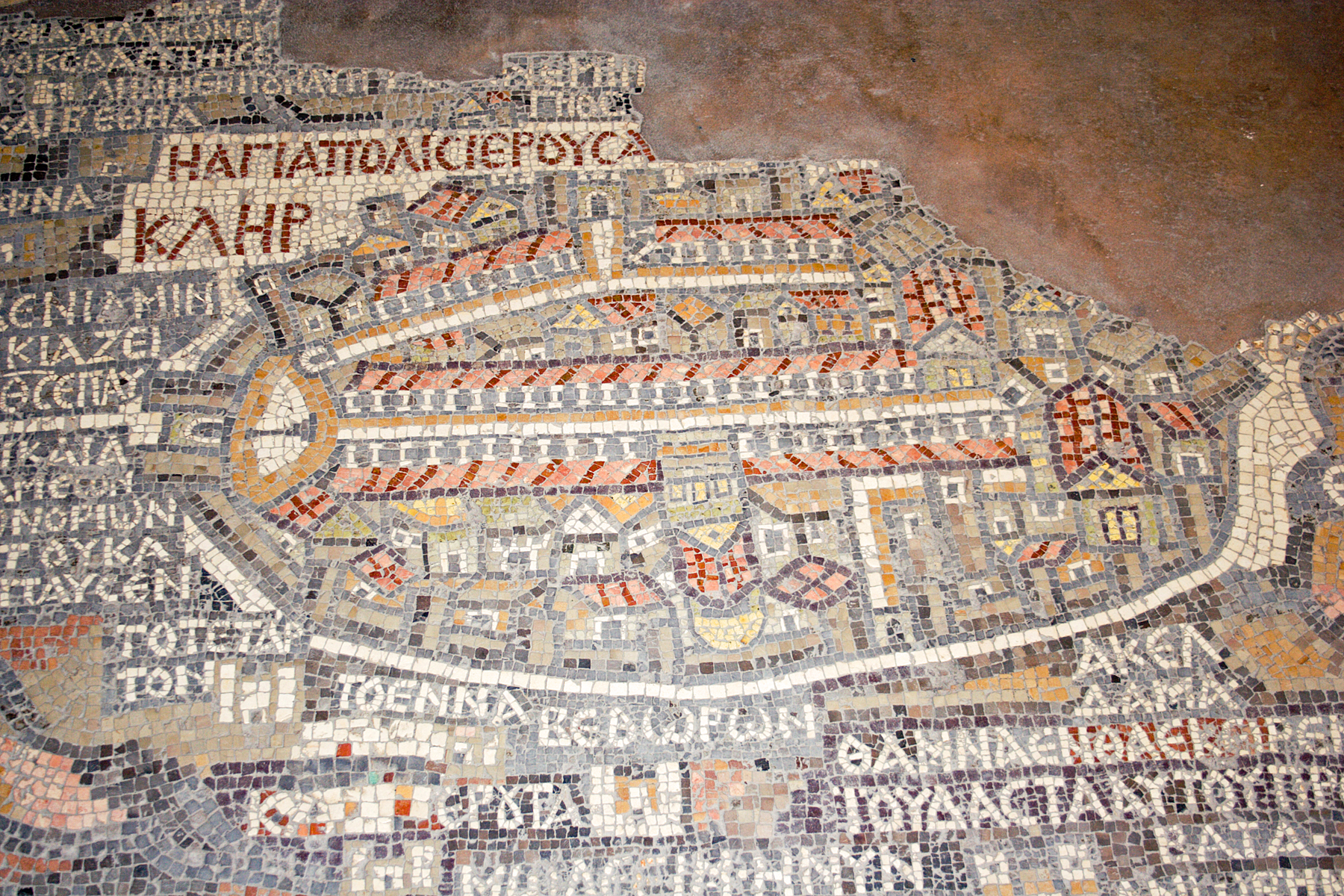
The Madaba Map, a sixth-century mosaic of Jerusalem (Η ΑΓΙΑ ΠΟΛΙϹ) uses the lunate sigma

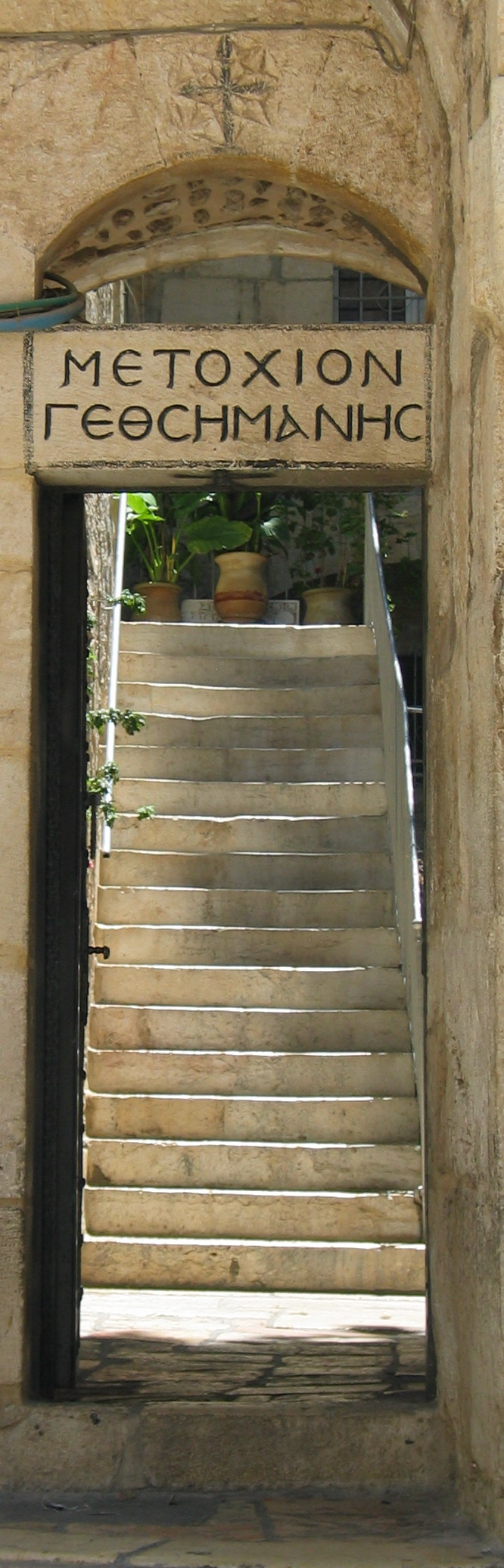
A plaque reading "Metochion of Gethsemane" (Μετόχιον Γεθσημανῆς) in Jerusalem, with a lunate sigma both at the end and in the middle of the word

In handwritten Greek during the Hellenistic period (4th–3rd century BC), the epigraphic form of Σ was simplified into a C-like shape, which has also been found on coins from the 4th century BC onward. This became the universal standard form of sigma during late antiquity and the Middle Ages.

Today, it is known as lunate sigma (uppercase Ϲ, lowercase ϲ), because of its crescent-like shape, and is still widely used in decorative typefaces in Greece, especially in religious and church contexts (i.e. the Christogram ΙϹ ΧϹ), as well as in some modern print editions of classical Greek texts.

A dotted lunate sigma (sigma periestigmenon, Ͼ) was used by Aristarchus of Samothrace (220–143 BC) as an editorial sign indicating that the line thus marked is at an incorrect position. Similarly, a reversed sigma (antisigma, Ͻ), may mark a line that is out of place. A dotted antisigma (antisigma periestigmenon, Ͽ) may indicate a line after which rearrangements should be made, or to variant readings of uncertain priority.

In Greek inscriptions from the late first century BC onwards, Ͻ was an abbreviation indicating that a man's father's name is the same as his own name, thus Dionysodoros Dionysodorou (Dionysodoros son of Dionysodoros) would be written Διονυσόδωρος Ͻ.

In Unicode, the above variations of lunate sigma are encoded as U+03F9 Ϲ GREEK CAPITAL LUNATE SIGMA SYMBOL; U+03FD Ͻ GREEK CAPITAL REVERSED LUNATE SIGMA SYMBOL, U+03FE Ͼ GREEK CAPITAL DOTTED LUNATE SIGMA SYMBOL, and U+03FF Ͽ GREEK CAPITAL REVERSED DOTTED LUNATE SIGMA SYMBOL.

=== Derived alphabets ===
Sigma was adopted in the Old Italic alphabets beginning in the 8th century BC. At that time a simplified three-stroke version, omitting the lowermost stroke, was already found in Western Greek alphabets, and was incorporated into classical Etruscan and Oscan, as well as in the earliest Latin epigraphy (early Latin S), such as the Duenos inscription. The alternation between three and four (and occasionally more than four) strokes was also adopted into the early runic alphabet (early form of the s-rune). Both the Anglo-Saxon runes and the Younger Futhark consistently use the simplified three-stroke version.

The letter С of Cyrillic script and Ⲥ of the Coptic script originates in the lunate form of Sigma.

== Uses ==
=== Language and linguistics ===
- In both Ancient and Modern Greek, the sigma represents the voiceless alveolar fricative [s]. In Modern Greek, this sound is voiced to the voiced alveolar fricative [z] when occurring before [m], [n], [v], [ð], or [ɣ].
- The uppercase form of sigma (Σ) was re-borrowed into the Latin alphabet—more precisely, the International African Alphabet—to serve as the uppercase of modern esh (lowercase: ʃ).
- In phonology, σ is used to represent syllables.
- In linguistics, Σ represents the set of symbols that form an alphabet (see also computer science).
- In historical linguistics, Σ is used to represent a Common Brittonic consonant with a sound between [s] and [h]; perhaps an aspirated [ʃʰ].

=== Science and mathematics ===
==== Mathematics ====
- In general mathematics, lowercase σ is commonly used to represent unknown angles, additionally serving as a shorthand for "countably", whereas Σ is regularly used as the operator for summation, e.g.:

$$\sum_{k=0}^5k= 0 + 1 + 2 + 3 + 4 + 5 = 15$$

- In mathematical logic, $\Sigma^0_n$ is used to denote the set of formulae with bounded quantifiers beginning with existential quantifiers, alternating $n-1$ times between existential and universal quantifiers. This notation reflects an indirect analogy between the relationship of summation and products on one hand, and existential and universal quantifiers on the other. See the article on the arithmetic hierarchy.
- In statistics, σ represents the standard deviation of population or probability distribution (where mu or μ is used for the mean).
- In topology, σ-compact topological space is one that can be written as a countable union of compact subsets.
- In mathematical analysis and in probability theory, there is a type of algebra of sets known as σ-algebra (aka σ-field). Sigma algebra also includes terms such as:
  - σ(A), denoting the generated sigma-algebra of a set A
  - Σ-finite measure (see measure theory)
- In number theory, σ is included in various divisor functions, especially the sigma function or sum-of-divisors function.
- In applied mathematics, σ(T) denotes the spectrum of a linear map T.
- In complex analysis, σ is used in the Weierstrass sigma function.
- In probability theory and statistics, Σ denotes the covariance matrix of a set of random variables, sometimes in the form $\;|\!\!\!\Sigma$ to distinguish it from the summation operator.
- Theoretical spectral analysis uses σ as standard deviation opposed to lowercase mu as the absolute mean value.

==== Biology, physiology, and medicine ====
- In biology, the sigma receptor (σ–receptors) is a type of cell surface receptor.
- In biochemistry, the σ factor (or specificity factor) is a protein found in RNA polymerase.
- In bone physiology, the bone remodeling period—i.e., the life span of a basic multicellular unit—has historically been referred to as the sigma period.
- In early 20th-century physiology literature, σ had been used to represent milliseconds.

==== Business, finance, and economics ====
- In finance, σ is the symbol used to represent volatility of stocks, usually measured by the standard deviation of logarithmic returns.
- In accounting, Σ indicates the balance of invoice classes and the overall amount of debts and demands.
- In macroeconomics, σ is used in equations to represent the elasticity of substitution between two inputs.
- In the machine industry, Six Sigma (6σ) is a quality model based on the standard deviation.

==== Chemistry ====
- Sigma bonds (σ bonds) are the strongest type of covalent chemical bond.
- In organic chemistry, σ symbolizes the sigma constant of Hammett equation.
- In alchemy, Σ was sometimes used to represent sugar.

==== Engineering and computer science ====
- In computer science, Σ represents the set of symbols that form an alphabet (see also linguistics)
- Relational algebra uses the values $\sigma_{a \theta b}( R )$ and $\sigma_{a \theta v}( R )$ to denote selections, which are a type of unary operation.
- In machine learning, σ is used in the formula that derives the Sigmoid function.
- In radar jamming or electronic warfare, radar cross-sections (RCS) are commonly represented as σ when measuring the size of a target's image on radar.
- In signal processing, σ denotes the damping ratio of a system parameter.
- In theoretical computer science, Σ serves as the busy beaver function.
- In civil engineering, σ refers to the normal stress applied on a material or structure.

==== Physics ====
- In nuclear and particle physics, σ is used to denote cross sections in general (see also RCS), while Σ represents macroscopic cross sections [1/length].
- The symbol is to denote the Stefan–Boltzmann constant.
- In relation to fundamental properties of material, σ is often used to signify electrical conductivity.
- In electrostatics, σ represents surface charge density.
- In continuum mechanics, σ is used to signify normal stress.
- In condensed matter physics, Σ denotes self-energy.
- The symbol can be used to signify surface tension (alternatively, γ or T are also used instead).
- In quantum mechanics, σ is used to indicate Pauli matrices.
- In astronomy, σ represents velocity dispersion.
- In astronomy, the prefix Σ is used to designate double stars of the Catalogus Novus Stellarum Duplicium by Friedrich Georg Wilhelm von Struve.
- In particle physics, Σ represents a class of baryons.
- In oceanography, σ represents sea water density.

=== Organizations ===
- During the 1930s, an uppercase Σ was in use as the symbol of the Ação Integralista Brasileira, a fascist political party in Brazil.
- Sigma Corporation uses the name of the letter but not the letter itself, but in many Internet forums, photographers refer to the company or its lenses using the letter.
- Sigma Aldrich incorporate both the name and the character in their logo.

== Unicode ==
- U+037B ͻ GREEK SMALL REVERSED LUNATE SIGMA SYMBOL
- U+037C ͼ GREEK SMALL DOTTED LUNATE SIGMA SYMBOL
- U+037D ͽ GREEK SMALL REVERSED DOTTED LUNATE SIGMA SYMBOL
- U+03A3 Σ GREEK CAPITAL LETTER SIGMA (&Sigma;)
- U+03C2 ς GREEK SMALL LETTER FINAL SIGMA (&sigmaf;, &sigmav;, &varsigma;)
- U+03C3 σ GREEK SMALL LETTER SIGMA (&sigma;)
- U+03F2 ϲ GREEK LUNATE SIGMA SYMBOL
- U+03F9 Ϲ GREEK CAPITAL LUNATE SIGMA SYMBOL
- U+03FD Ͻ GREEK CAPITAL REVERSED LUNATE SIGMA SYMBOL
- U+03FE Ͼ GREEK CAPITAL DOTTED LUNATE SIGMA SYMBOL
- U+03FF Ͽ GREEK CAPITAL REVERSED DOTTED LUNATE SIGMA SYMBOL
- U+2140 ⅀ DOUBLE-STRUCK N-ARY SUMMATION
- U+2211 ∑ N-ARY SUMMATION (&Sum;, &sum;)
- U+23B2 ⎲ SUMMATION TOP (Note: Combined with U+23B3 to make a double-high sigma)
- U+23B3 ⎳ SUMMATION BOTTOM
- U+2CA4 Ⲥ COPTIC CAPITAL LETTER SIMA
- U+2CA5 ⲥ COPTIC SMALL LETTER SIMA
- U+2CEA ⳪ COPTIC SYMBOL SHIMA SIMA
- U+1D6BA 𝚺 MATHEMATICAL BOLD CAPITAL SIGMA (Note: The mathematical characters should only be used for math. Stylized Greek text should be encoded using the normal Greek letters, with markup and formatting to indicate text style.)
- U+1D6D3 𝛓 MATHEMATICAL BOLD SMALL FINAL SIGMA
- U+1D6D4 𝛔 MATHEMATICAL BOLD SMALL SIGMA
- U+1D6F4 𝛴 MATHEMATICAL ITALIC CAPITAL SIGMA
- U+1D70D 𝜍 MATHEMATICAL ITALIC SMALL FINAL SIGMA
- U+1D70E 𝜎 MATHEMATICAL ITALIC SMALL SIGMA
- U+1D72E 𝜮 MATHEMATICAL BOLD ITALIC CAPITAL SIGMA
- U+1D747 𝝇 MATHEMATICAL BOLD ITALIC SMALL FINAL SIGMA
- U+1D748 𝝈 MATHEMATICAL BOLD ITALIC SMALL SIGMA
- U+1D768 𝝨 MATHEMATICAL SANS-SERIF BOLD CAPITAL SIGMA
- U+1D781 𝞁 MATHEMATICAL SANS-SERIF BOLD SMALL FINAL SIGMA
- U+1D782 𝞂 MATHEMATICAL SANS-SERIF BOLD SMALL SIGMA
- U+1D7A2 𝞢 MATHEMATICAL SANS-SERIF BOLD ITALIC CAPITAL SIGMA
- U+1D7BB 𝞻 MATHEMATICAL SANS-SERIF BOLD ITALIC SMALL FINAL SIGMA
- U+1D7BC 𝞼 MATHEMATICAL SANS-SERIF BOLD ITALIC SMALL SIGMA

== See also ==
- Antisigma
- Greek letters used in mathematics, science, and engineering
- Sampi
- Sho (letter)
- Stigma (letter)
- Sibilant consonant
- Summation (Σ)
- Combining form "sigm-" (e.g. sigmodon, sigmurethra, etc.)
- Derivative "sigmoid" (e.g. sigmoid sinus, sigmoid colon, sigmoidoscopy, etc.)
