= Solid cell nests =

Specific groups of cells found in the thyroid gland of babies

Solid cell nests, often abbreviated as SCN, also known as solid cell rests, are specific groups of cells found in the thyroid gland of babies. Typically they are a fraction of a millimeter in size but can rarely become larger. They are considered to be the remains of the ultimobranchial body that exists in early development.

== Discovery ==
Solid cell nests were discovered in 1907 by pathologist Sophia Getzowa, as documented in her paper titled "Über die Glandula parathyreoidea, intrathyreoideale Zellhaufen derselben und Reste des postbranchialen Körpers".
