= Bone (journal) =

- Discipline: Osteology, orthopedics
- Language: English
- Edited by: Peter Ebeling

Publication details
- Former names: Metabolic Bone Disease and Related Research, Bone and Mineral
- History: 1978–present
- Publisher: Elsevier
- Frequency: Bimonthly
- Impact factor: 4.147 (2019)

Standard abbreviations
- ISO 4: Bone

Indexing
- CODEN: BONEDL
- ISSN: 8756-3282 (print); 1873-2763 (web)
- LCCN: 93642546
- OCLC no.: 11527159

Links
- Journal homepage

Bone is a bimonthly peer-reviewed medical journal covering the study of bone biology and mineral metabolism. It absorbed two journals, Metabolic Bone Disease and Related Research and Mineral and Bone, during its history. It was once the official journal of the International Bone and Mineral Society (IBMS), but has been an independently published journal since 2012.

== History ==
The journal has its origins in several journals which merged.

Metabolic Bone Disease and Related Research was established in 1978, with a different ISSN.

According to the IBMS website, two scientific journals, Bone (with the same ISSN as this journal; 1985 onwards) and Bone and Mineral (Note: Misnamed on the website as Mineral and Bone) merged under the title Bone, which became the official journal of IBMS, published monthly, until the relationship between the journal and IBMS ended on 31 December 2012. The website notes that Bone went on to become a leading journal in the field, "publishing top-notch, peer-reviewed content on both the basic science and clinical sides".

== Description ==
As of 2024 Bone is published by Elsevier and the editor-in-chief is Peter Ebeling of Monash University in Melbourne, Australia.

According to the Journal Citation Reports, the journal had an impact factor of 4.147 in 2019.

== See also ==
- IBMS BoneKEy
- Journal of Bone and Mineral Research
