= Christopher J. Hernandez =

American engineer and scientist

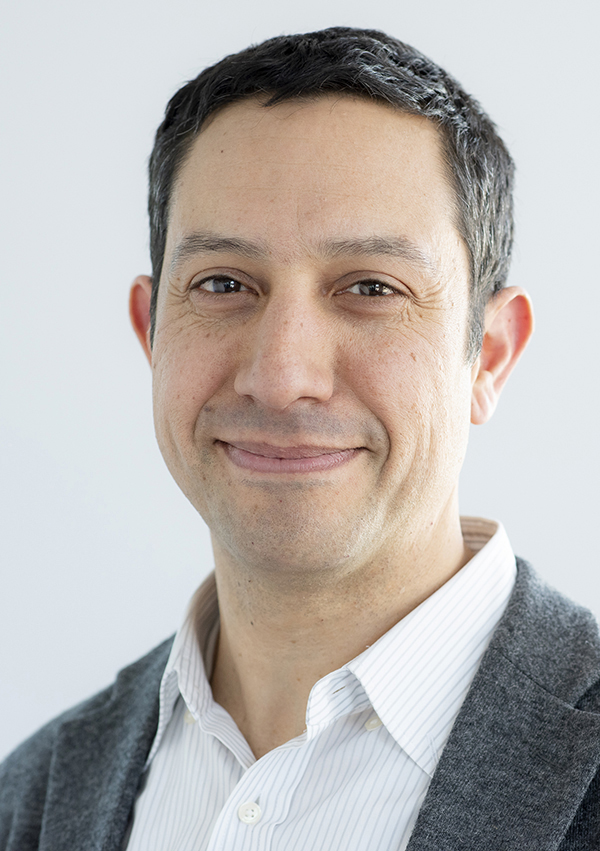
Christopher J. Hernandez

Christopher J. Hernandez is an American engineer and scientist who currently serves as professor at the University of California, San Francisco in the departments of Orthopaedic Surgery and Bioengineering and Therapeutic Sciences.

== Education ==
Hernandez received his BS in Engineering Sciences at Harvard University in 1996. He went on to graduate from Stanford University with a MS and PhD in Mechanical Engineering in 1997 and 2001 respectively.

== Career ==
Hernandez worked at the Mount Sinai School of Medicine in New York and at UC Berkeley prior to joining the faculty at Case Western Reserve University. He served as a faculty member in the Sibley School of Mechanical and Aerospace Engineering at Cornell University from 2010 to 2022.

He currently leads the Hernandez Research Group. Hernandez's "research in biomechanics examines the musculoskeletal system and microscopic organisms." In 2021, the National Institutes of Health awarded his team a five-year, $3.6 million grant to study how the gut microbiome affects bone quality.

=== Honors and awards ===
Some of Hernandez's honors have included:

- BRITE Fellow (National Science Foundation, 2022)
- Educator of the Year - Higher Education (Society of Hispanic Professional Engineers, 2021)
- Fellow (Biomedical Engineering Society, 2021)
- Fellow (American Institute for Medical and Biological Engineering, 2019)
- Fellow (American Society of Mechanical Engineers, 2017)
- Fellow (American Society for Bone and Mineral Research, 2019)
- Fuller Albright Award (American Society for Bone and Mineral Research, 2018)
- Zellman Warhaft Faculty Commitment to Diversity Award (Cornell University, 2017)

Hernandez is a member of the American Society for Bone and Mineral Research and the Orthopaedic Research Society.

=== Personal life ===
Hernandez was born in Fresno, California and is Mexican American.
