= Douglas Harold Copp =

Canadian scientist who discovered calcitonin (1915–1998)

- Born: January 16, 1915; Toronto, Ontario
- Died: March 17, 1998 (aged 83)
- Education: University of Toronto; University of California, Berkeley
- Awards: Gairdner Foundation International Award (1967); Flavelle Medal (1972)
- Scientific career
- Fields: Biochemistry
- Workplaces: University of British Columbia

Douglas Harold Copp CC FRS FRSC (January 16, 1915 – March 17, 1998) was a Canadian scientist who discovered and named the hormone calcitonin, which is used in the treatment of bone disease.

== Early life and education ==
Douglas Harold Copp was born in Toronto, Ontario, on January 16, 1915.

He received his MD from the University of Toronto in 1939 and his PhD in biochemistry from the University of California at Berkeley in 1943.

== Career ==
In 1950 Copp became the first head of the physiology department in the newly-established Faculty of Medicine at the University of British Columbia.

== Recognition, honours and legacy ==
- In 1967 he received the Gardner International Award jointly with the British endocrinologist Iain Macintyre who had sequenced calcitonin and showed it originated in the thyroid gland.
- He was elected fellow of the Royal Society of Canada.
- In 1971 he was elected fellow of both the Royal Society
- In 1971 he was made an Officer of the Order of Canada and was promoted to Companion in 1980.
- In 1972 he was awarded the Flavelle Medal Award of the Royal Society of Canada.
- In 1980 he was made Companion of the Order of Canada
- In 1994 he was inducted into the Canadian Medical Hall of Fame.
- In 2000 he was inducted into the Canadian Science and Engineering Hall of Fame.
- From 2001 until 2009, the International Bone and Mineral Society awarded the biennial D. Harold Copp Award, named in honour of Copp.
