= Sigmoid =

Sigmoid means resembling the lower-case Greek letter sigma (uppercase Σ, lowercase σ, lowercase in word-final position ς) or the Latin letter S. Specific uses include:

- Sigmoid function, a mathematical function
- Sigmoid colon, part of the large intestine or colon
- Sigmoid sinus, two structures that drain blood from the bottom of the brain
- Sigmoid arteries, a pair/trio of arteries in the lower abdomen

== See also ==
- Ogee, similar shape, term sometimes used for sigmoids
