= Amylin family =

Calc_CGRP_IAPP
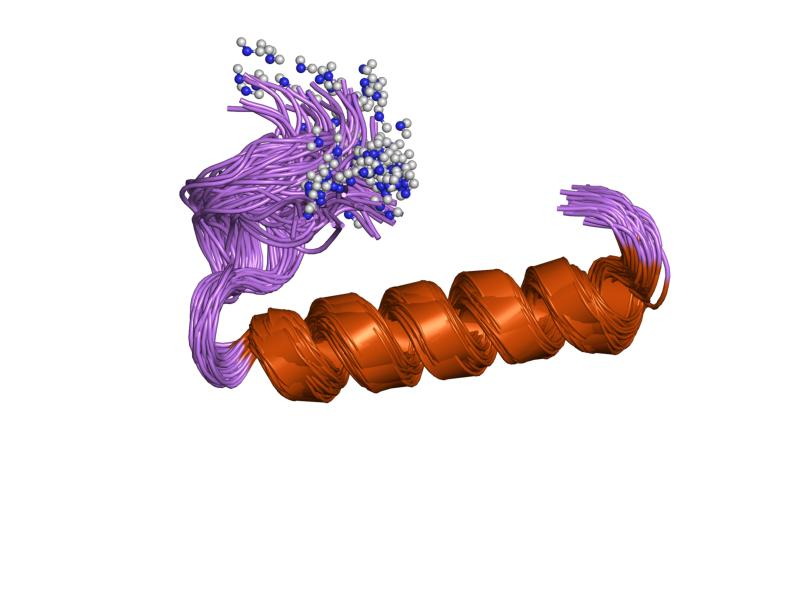
- solution conformation of salmon calcitonin in sodium dodecyl sulfate micelles

Identifiers
- Symbol: Calc_CGRP_IAPP
- Pfam: PF00214
- InterPro: IPR021116
- PROSITE: PDOC00231
- SCOP2: 1bzb / SCOPe / SUPFAM
- TCDB: 1.C.49
- OPM superfamily: 243
- OPM protein: 2jxz
Available protein structures:
- PDB: IPR021116 PF00214 (ECOD; PDBsum)
- AlphaFold: IPR021116; PF00214

In molecular biology, the amylin peptide family or calcitonin/CGRP/IAPP peptide family is a family of peptides, which includes the precursors of calcitonin/calcitonin gene-related peptide (CGRP), islet amyloid polypeptide (IAPP) and adrenomedullin.

Calcitonin is a 32 amino acid polypeptide hormone that causes a rapid but short-lived drop in the level of calcium and phosphate in the blood, by promoting the incorporation of these ions in the bones, alpha type. Alternative splicing of the gene coding for calcitonin produces a distantly related peptide of 37 amino acids, called calcitonin gene-related peptide (CGRP), beta type. CGRP induces vasodilatation in a variety of vessels, including the coronary, cerebral and systemic vasculature. Its abundance in the CNS also points toward a neurotransmitter or neuromodulator role.

Islet amyloid polypeptide (IAPP) (also known as diabetes-associated peptide (DAP), or amylin) is a peptide of 37 amino acids that selectively inhibits insulin-stimulated glucose utilization and glycogen deposition in muscle, while not affecting adipocyte glucose metabolism. Structurally, IAPP is closely related to CGRP.

Two conserved cysteines in the N-terminal of these peptides are known to be involved in a disulfide bond. The C-terminal amino acid of all three peptides is amidated.

               xCxxxxxCxxxxxxxxxxxxxxxxxxxxxxxxxxxx-NH(2)
                |     |                             Amide group
                +-----+

== Subfamilies ==
- Calcitonin, alpha type InterPro: IPR001935
- Calcitonin, beta type InterPro: IPR002163

== Human proteins containing this domain ==
CALCA; CALCB; IAPP
