= Electronic Medicines Compendium =

The Electronic Medicines Compendium is a provider of information on medicines, produced by Datapharm. It lists summaries of product characteristics and patient information leaflets.
