= Bone remodeling period =

In bone physiology, the bone remodeling period describes the temporal duration (i.e. lifespan) of the basic multicellular unit (BMU) that is responsible for bone turnover. Historically, this was referred to as the sigma (σ) or sigma period, but that terminology is outdated.

== Bone remodeling ==
Although bone may appear superficially as a static tissue, it is actually very dynamic, undergoing constant remodeling throughout the life of the vertebrate organism. This occurs with the synchronized action of osteoclasts and osteoblasts, cells that resorb and deposit bone, respectively.

== The remodeling period ==
The remodeling period consists of the combined duration of the resorption, the osteoclastic reversal (the phase marked by shifting of resorption processes into formative processes) and the formation periods of bone growth and development. This period refers to the average total duration of a single cycle of bone remodeling at any point on a bone surface.

Remodeling duration (weeks)
	Resorption	Reversal	Formation	Total
Rabbits	1	0.5	4.5	6
Dogs	1.5	0.5	10	12
Humans	2	2	13	17

For the remodeling to occur, appropriate cell signaling occurs to trigger osteoclasts to resorb the surface of the bone, followed by deposition of bone by osteoblasts. Together, the cells in any given particular region of the bone surface that are responsible for bone remodeling are known as the basic multicellular unit (BMU), and it is the average lifespan of the BMU that is referred to as the remodeling period. The size of a BMU is roughly 200μm in diameter, defined by the 100μm diffusion capability in bone.

=== Determining the bone remodeling period ===
In calculating the bone remodeling period, a two-dimensional model is examined, referring to the time it takes for the area in question to be eroded and then filled in with new bone (sigma will be used here for simplicity's sake). The bone formation portion (σ_{f}) of the bone remodeling period is calculated as follows:

$$\sigma_{f} = \frac{MWT}{M_{f}}$$

in which MWT refers to the mean wall thickness of the completed bone unit and M_{f} refers to the prevailing mean effective bone appositional rate. In other words, what this formula means is that the bone remodeling period is equivalent to the thickness of the microscopic segment of bone being formed divided by the rate at which it forms. If the mean linear rate of bone resorption is known, the bone resorption portion (σ_{r}) can be similarly calculated:

$$\sigma_{r} = \frac{MWT}{M_{r}}$$

Consequently, the entire bone remodeling period (σ_{r + f}, equivalent to σ) can be represented by the following formula:

$$\sigma_{(r + f)} = \frac{MWT}{M_{r}} + \frac{MWT}{M_{f}}$$

The linear bone resorption rate (M_{r}) cannot be measured directly, but it approximates a third of σ_{f}.

== Interspecies differences ==
Each vertebrate species exhibits a distinct duration of bone regeneration and remodeling, and it appears as though there is an inversely proportional relationship between the rate of bone regeneration and the phylogenetic evolution of the animal. Each remodeling period lasts 3–6 months in humans, 3 months in dogs, and 6 weeks in rabbits.
