= Gillian Reid =

British chemist (born 1964)

Gillian Reid CBE CChem FRSC FRSE
- Education: University of Edinburgh
- Scientific career
- Workplaces: University of Southampton
- Thesis: Studies on transition metal macrocyclic complexes. (1989)

Gillian Reid (born 1964) is a British chemist who is Professor of Inorganic Chemistry and former Head of the Department of Chemistry at the University of Southampton. Her research considers coordination chemistry, inorganic semiconductors and metal fluoride scaffolds. In 2020, she was appointed the President-elect of the Royal Society of Chemistry, becoming President in 2022.

== Early life and education ==
Reid became interested in chemistry while at high school. She eventually studied chemistry at the University of Edinburgh, where she earned her bachelor's degree in 1986. She remained there for her doctoral research, where she studied macrocyclic complexes. After earning her degree in 1989, and a 2-year postdoctoral research position in Edinburgh, Reid moved to a lectureship in the University of Southampton.

== Research and career ==
In 1991, Reid joined the University of Southampton as a lecturer. She was promoted to Professor in 2006. Under her leadership, Southampton joined the Knowledge Centre for Materials Chemistry. Reid leads molecular assembly and structure at the University of Southampton.

Her research considers inorganic coordination chemistry, with a particular focus on the design of macrocyclic ligands that involve chalcogen donor atoms. She makes use of non-aqueous electrodeposition to grow inorganic semiconductor alloys. Electrodeposition allows for bottom-up growth without the need for an ultra-high vacuum environment. Reid has created molecular reagents that allow the synthesis of compounds for use in non-volatile memory, thermoelectric generators and two-dimensional materials. The reagents were used to deposit a wide variety of thin films including highly pure germanium telluride, molybdenum disulphide and tungsten disulphide.

In 2002, Reid co-founded the Southampton Science and Engineering Day, which has since evolved into the Southampton Science and Engineering Festival. The event was founded to coincide with British Science Week, which occurs annually in March. In 2010, Reid was made the Head of the Department of Chemistry Outreach Programme. In 2015, she co-led the Royal Society Summer Science exhibit Taking Technology Smaller, which introduced the public to electrochemistry as a means to build nanoscale electronic devices.

== Awards and honours ==
- 2006 Vice-Chancellor's Award for Teaching in Chemistry
- 2007 Royal Society of Chemistry Award for Achievement in the Promotion of Chemistry
- 2011 Elected a member of the Council of the Royal Society of Chemistry
- 2012 Elected Fellow of the Royal Society of Chemistry
- 2020 Appointed the President-elect of the Royal Society of Chemistry
- 2022 Elected Fellow of the Royal Society of Edinburgh
- 2024 CBE "for services to the chemical sciences and to inclusion and diversity".

== Selected publications ==
- Levason, William; Orchard, Simon D.; Reid, Gillian (1 February 2002). "Recent developments in the chemistry of selenoethers and telluroethers". Coordination Chemistry Reviews. 225 (1): 159–199. doi:10.1016/S0010-8545(01)00412-X. ISSN 0010-8545.
- Lin, Gang; Reid, Gillian; Bugg, Timothy D. H. (May 2001). "Extradiol Oxidative Cleavage of Catechols by Ferrous and Ferric Complexes of 1,4,7-Triazacyclononane: Insight into the Mechanism of the Extradiol Catechol Dioxygenases". Journal of the American Chemical Society. 123 (21): 5030–5039. Bibcode:2001JAChS.123.5030L. doi:10.1021/ja004280u. ISSN 0002-7863. PMID 11457331.
- Cheng, Fei; Hector, Andrew L.; Levason, William; Reid, Gillian; Webster, Michael; Zhang, Wenjian (29 June 2009). "Germanium(II) Dications Stabilized by Azamacrocycles and Crown Ethers". Angewandte Chemie. 121 (28): 5254–5256. Bibcode:2009AngCh.121.5254C. doi:10.1002/ange.200901247. PMID 19504510.

== Personal life ==
Reid has two children and a dog.
