= Dukagjin Pupovci =

Albanian professor, education expert, and critic

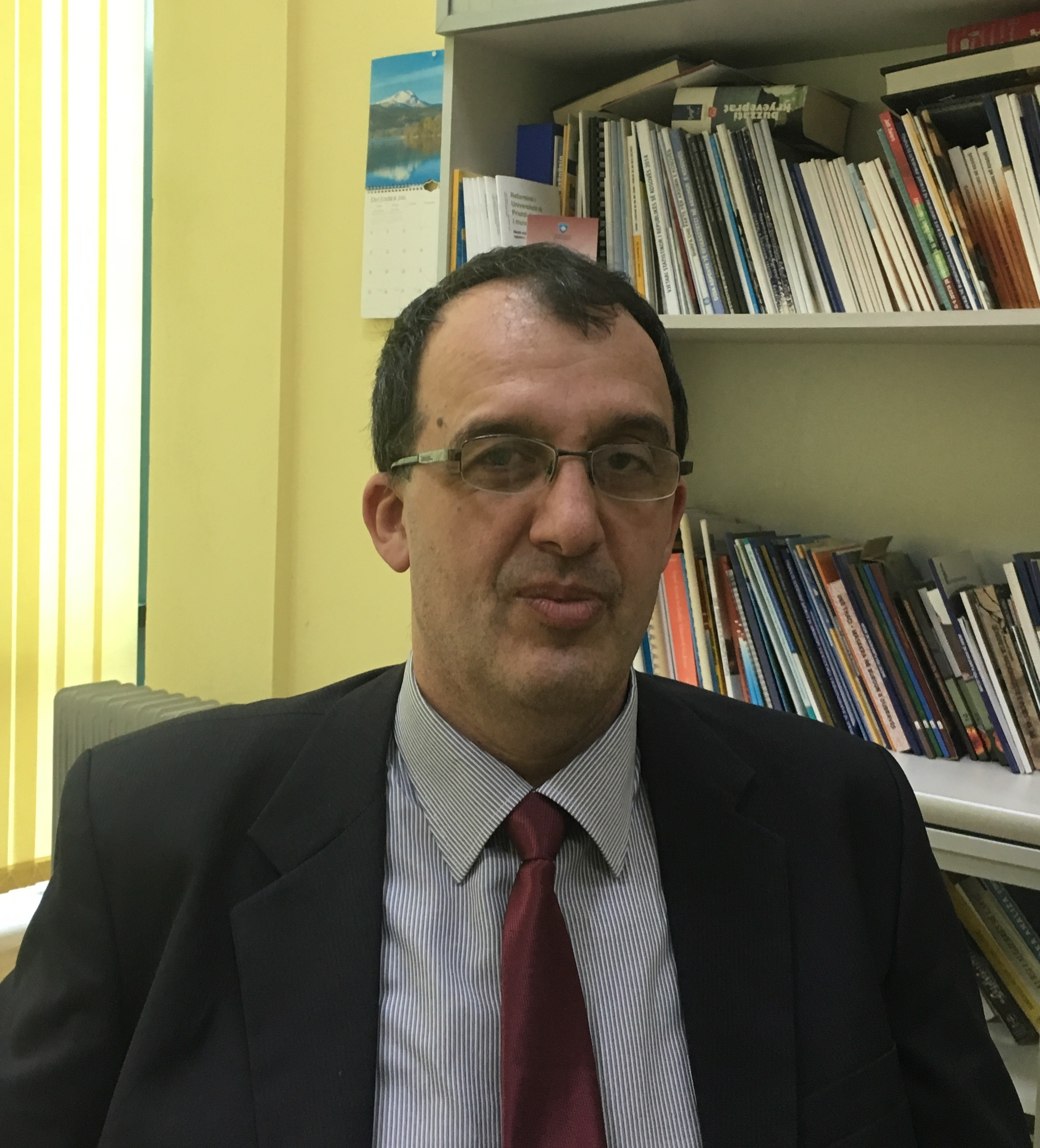
- Dukagjin Pupovci

Deputy Minister of Education in Kosovo
- In office April 2021 – December 2022

Personal details
- Born: 5 June 1964 (age 61)

Dukagjin Pupovci (born 5 June 1964) is a Kosovo-Albanian professor, education expert and a critic of the education system in Kosovo. He has contributed to the development of important policy documents and has co-authored numerous studies and articles in the field of education and research in Kosovo.

== Career ==
Pupovci holds a Doctor of Philosophy degree in mathematics and was a lecturer at numerous universities, including the Universiteti i Prishtinës in Pristina. He was the executive director of the Kosovo Education Center from 2000 to 2021. He was Deputy Minister of Education in the Government of Kosovo from April 2021 to December 2022.
