= Michael J. Horowitz =

American electrical engineer (born 1964)

Michael J. Horowitz (born January 2, 1964, in Ames, Iowa) is an American electrical engineer whose contributions to video coding standardization and early integration of newly minted standards into video products have facilitated the widespread commercial adoption of the H.264 AVC, H.264 SVC, H.265 HEVC, and AV1 video coding standards. He is co-inventor of flexible macroblock ordering (FMO) and tiles, essential features in H.264|AVC and H.265|HEVC, respectively.

== Early Background ==
Horowitz was born and raised in Ames, Iowa. He received an A.B. degree from Cornell University. In 1998, under the supervision of Professor David Neuhoff, he received a Ph.D. in electrical engineering from The University of Michigan.

== Standardization ==
Several video coding standards have been published over the past forty years. Not all have been widely adopted. Excellent compression performance does not guarantee commercial viability. Other factors such as computational complexity play important roles. Horowitz led efforts to reduce computational complexity during the development of the H.264|AVC and H.265|HEVC standards. In a related effort, to leverage the full computational power of multi-core CPUs, he led the effort to develop H.265|HEVC coding tools for high-level parallelism (e.g., tiles).

In addition to computational complexity reduction work, Horowitz has led standardization development efforts for error resilience tools (e.g., FMO in H.264|AVC) and the real-time bitstream transport protocol (RTP) for AV1.

== Early Commercialization ==
The complexity of modern video coding standards demands a great deal of engineering effort and skill to develop product-ready implementations of the standard. For example, to become production-ready a software codec implementation may need to be optimized to run thousands of times faster than the standard's reference software. Products released shortly after the publication of a standard demonstrate commercial viability thereby facilitating adoption by other manufacturers who might otherwise opt not to risk using the standard.

In May 2000 while at Polycom, Horowitz developed and demonstrated the first product-ready implementation of macroblock-adaptive multiple reference frames overcoming concerns that its high computational complexity would prevent commercial adoption. The tool was published as Annex U of H.263. Macroblock-adaptive multiple reference frames is a mainstay of every subsequent video coding standard.

In 2003, while still at Polycom, he led the team that produced the first commercially available in-product implementation of H.264|AVC demonstrating that the new H.264|AVC standard could be used successfully in real-time low-delay commercial products.

In 2008, at Vidyo, Horowitz architected and led the team that developed the first commercially available in-product implementation of H.264 SVC

In 2012, at eBrisk Video, Horowitz served as lead engineer of the team that developed one of the first commercially available implementations of H.265|HEVC demonstrating that a real-time software implementation of the standard could yield high coding efficiency.

In 2020, at Google, Horowitz served as technical lead of the AV1 for Google Duo project that became the first commercially available real-time interactive video implementation of AV1, dispelling the myth that older entry-level mobile devices did not have sufficient computational resources to support a real-time software implementation of AV1. The AV1 implementation in Duo and subsequently Google Meet supports video calling at bit rates as low as 40 kilobits per second on modest entry-level mobile devices thereby enabling people to connect in regions of the world where video calls would not otherwise be possible.
