= American Society for Bone and Mineral Research =

The American Society for Bone and Mineral Research (ASBMR) is a professional, scientific and medical society established in 1977 to promote excellence in bone and mineral research and to facilitate the translation of that research into clinical practice. The ASBMR has a membership of nearly 4,000 physicians, basic research scientists, and clinical investigators from around the world.

== Mission ==
The mission of the ASBMR is to promote excellence in bone and mineral research, foster integration of clinical and basic science, and facilitate the translation of that science to health care and clinical practice. The Society's broad goals include supporting the educational development of future generations of basic and clinical scientists, and disseminating new knowledge in bone and mineral metabolism.

== Founding ==
In the 1970s, a growing number of US-based scientists began to focus their research on the understanding of basic bone biology and the disease osteoporosis. This led to the rise of a new field – bone and mineral research. In 1974, while attending the annual meeting of The Endocrine Society in Chicago, Illinois, USA, bone scientists Louis Avioli, Claude Arnaud, Norman Bell, William Peck, John Potts and Lawrence Raisz, along with Shirley Hohl, met at the Drake Hotel. The group laid the groundwork for an organization that would promote the study of bone and mineral research, support scientists involved in such research, and facilitate the discussion and exchange of new developments in the field. Three years later, in November 1977, the group's goals were realized with the official incorporation of the ASBMR as a nonprofit organization in St. Louis, Missouri, USA. The first ASBMR Annual Meeting was held June 11–12, 1979, at the Disneyland Hotel in Anaheim, California, USA, with approximately 150 people in attendance.

== Growth ==
In 1984, ASBMR leaders established The Osteoporosis Foundation, which was later renamed the National Osteoporosis Foundation.

The Journal of Bone and Mineral Research (JBMR), the official journal of the ASBMR, was established in 1986. Initially a bi-monthly publication, it became a monthly journal in 1990. Lawrence G. Raisz served as the first Editor-in-Chief of the JBMR.

The ASBMR published the first edition of The Primer on the Metabolic Bone Diseases and Disorders of Mineral Metabolism, a textbook for medical and graduate students, in 1990. Murray J. Favus served as the Editor-in-Chief for the first six editions of the Primer.

The rise of new pharmacological treatments for osteoporosis in the 1990s, most notably the class of drugs known as bisphosphonates, gave rise to an influx of scientists and clinician-researchers into the field. This influx resulted in a dramatic increase in ASBMR membership and annual meeting attendance. During this period, the ASBMR expanded its advocacy endeavors targeted at U.S. government funding for bone research. The Society was a founding member of the National Coalition for Osteoporosis and Related Bone Diseases ("Bone Coalition") in 1991. ASBMR also became a member of the Federation of American Societies for Experimental Biology (FASEB).

Though conceived as a scientific research society, in recent years, ASBMR has made increasing public and healthcare professional awareness of bone diseases a top priority. The Society launched several educational initiatives aimed at primary care physicians to improve the detection and treatment of bone diseases, and founded the National Bone Health Alliance to serve as a resource and raise public awareness of bone diseases. It has also spearheaded task forces on numerous clinically relevant topics, including: osteonecrosis of the jaw and atypical femoral fractures. The Society has also sought to expand the study of bone to those in related fields and to those in emerging areas of the world.

== Education ==
=== Annual meetings ===
ASBMR's annual meeting brings together leading basic, translational and clinical researchers in bone from around the world. The event is held in September or October and attracts nearly 4,000 attendees each year. The scientific program includes poster presentations, plenary lectures, workshops, networking events, ancillary meetings, and a host of other activities. Hallmarks of the ASBMR Annual Meeting include the Gerald D. Aurbach Lecture, the Louis V. Avioli Lecture, and the ASBMR/ECTS Clinical Debate. Abstracts from the meeting's poster presentations are published as supplements in the JBMR.

=== Topical Meetings ===
The ASBMR began holding topical meetings in 2002 to address specialized research topics within the bone field. Smaller in scale, topical meetings disseminate and discuss in-depth research on a specific area of scientific interest.

== Publications ==
=== Journal of Bone and Mineral Research ===
The Journal of Bone and Mineral Research, the official journal of the ASBMR. The JBMR publishes original manuscripts, reviews, and special articles in basic and clinical science relevant to bone, muscle and mineral metabolism. Manuscripts are published on the biology and physiology of bone and muscle, relevant systems biology topics (e.g. osteoimmunology), and the pathophysiology and treatment of osteoporosis, sarcopenia and other disorders of bone and mineral metabolism. 2016 Journal Citation Reports Impact Factor was 6.3, ranking 15/138 (Endocrinology & Metabolism).

JBMR readers include basic scientists and physicians specializing in endocrinology, physiology, cell biology, pathology, molecular genetics, epidemiology, internal medicine, rheumatology, orthopaedics, geriatrics, dentistry, gynecology, molecular biology, nephrology and many other disciplines. The JBMR's international editorial board encourages manuscript submissions from around the world.

=== Primer on the Metabolic Bone Diseases and Disorders of Mineral Metabolism ===
The Primer on the Metabolic Bone Diseases and Disorders of Mineral Metabolism is a resource for scientists and students seeking an overview of the bone and mineral field and for clinicians who see patients with disorders of bone and mineral metabolism. The text provides valuable information on the symptoms, pathophysiology, diagnosis, and treatment of metabolic bone diseases and both common and rare disorders. Authors include internationally renowned experts in the field.

=== ASBMR e-News Weekly ===
The ASBMR e-News Weekly is a member newsletter featuring society initiatives and related information on upcoming events, conferences, membership benefits, and other important information. The newsletter keeps members abreast of ASBMR activities—from Council, Committee, task force, and program updates to the role of ASBMR within the bone and mineral field and the scientific and medical community at large. Each issue also includes the most recently published articles in JBMR and highlights current noteworthy news articles pertaining to the bone field from thousands of news sources worldwide.

== Grants and awards ==
The Society has established numerous grant and award programs since its inception aimed at supporting the career development of its members, as well as recognizing their scientific accomplishments and contributions to the field.

== See also ==
- International Bone and Mineral Society
- Orthopaedic Research Society
- Australian and New Zealand Bone and Mineral Society
