= Bone remodeling =

Continuous turnover of bone matrix and mineral

Bone tissue is removed by osteoclasts, and then new bone tissue is formed by osteoblasts. Both processes utilize cytokine (TGF-β, IGF) signalling.

In osteology, bone remodeling or bone metabolism is a lifelong process where mature bone tissue is removed from the skeleton (a process called bone resorption) and new bone tissue is formed (a process called ossification or new bone formation). Recent research has identified a specialised subset of blood vessels, termed Type R endothelial cells, in the bone microenvironment. These blood vessels play a crucial role in adult bone remodelling by mediating interactions between bone-resorbing osteoclasts and bone-forming osteoblasts. Type R blood vessels are characterised by their association with post-arterial capillaries and exhibit unique remodelling properties crucial for bone homeostasis. These processes also control the reshaping or replacement of bone following injuries like fractures but also micro-damage, which occurs during normal activity. Remodeling responds also to functional demands of the mechanical loading.

In the first year of life, almost 100% of the skeleton is replaced. In adults, remodeling proceeds at about 10% per year.

An imbalance in the regulation of bone remodeling's two sub-processes, bone resorption and bone formation, results in many metabolic bone diseases, such as osteoporosis.

== Physiology ==
Bone homeostasis involves multiple but coordinated cellular and molecular events. Two main types of cells are responsible for bone metabolism: osteoblasts (which secrete new bone), and osteoclasts (which break bone down). The structure of bones as well as adequate supply of calcium requires close cooperation between these two cell types and other cell populations present at the bone remodeling sites (e.g. immune cells). Bone metabolism relies on complex signaling pathways and control mechanisms to achieve proper rates of growth and differentiation. These controls include the action of several hormones, including parathyroid hormone (PTH), vitamin D, growth hormone, steroids, and calcitonin, as well as several bone marrow-derived membrane and soluble cytokines and growth factors (e.g. M-CSF, RANKL, VEGF and IL-6 family). It is in this way that the body is able to maintain proper levels of calcium required for physiological processes. Thus bone remodeling is not just occasional "repair of bone damage" but rather an active, continual process that is always happening in a healthy body.

Subsequent to appropriate signaling, osteoclasts move to resorb the surface of the bone, followed by deposition of bone by osteoblasts. Together, the cells that are responsible for bone remodeling are known as the basic multicellular unit (BMU), and the temporal duration (i.e. lifespan) of the BMU is referred to as the bone remodeling period.

== Gallery ==
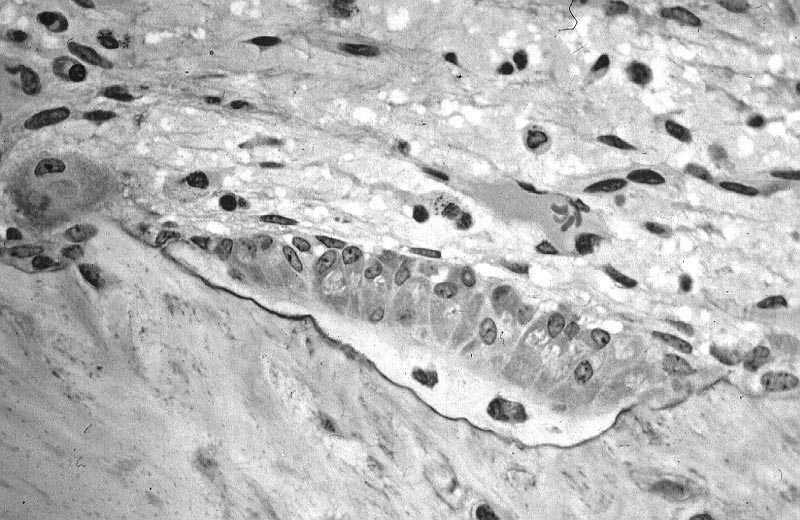
Osteoblasts actively synthesizing osteoid containing two osteocytes.

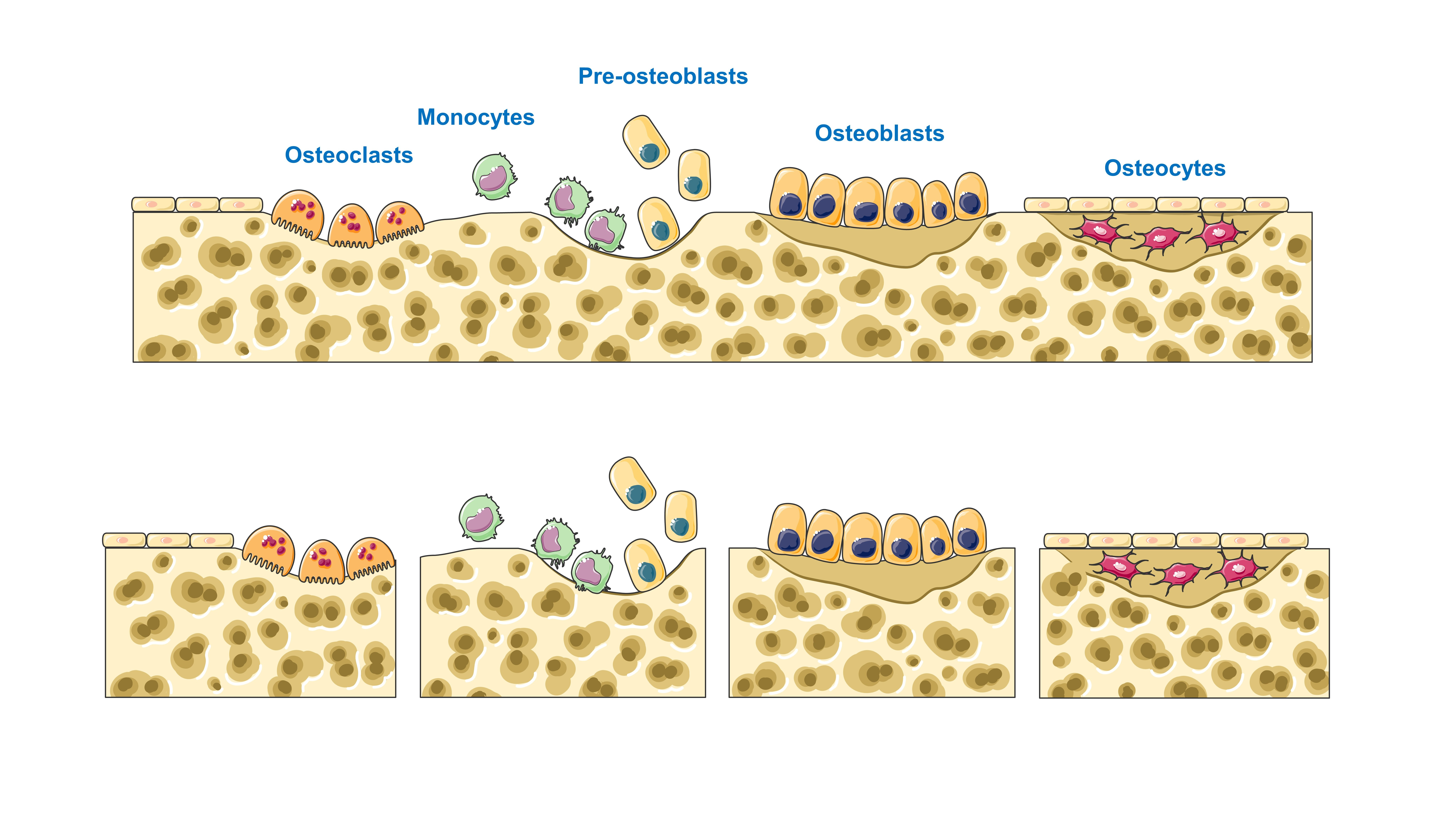
Illustration showing bone remodelling cycle

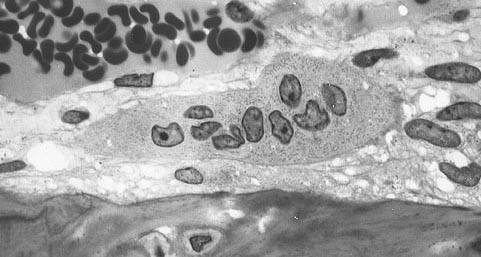
Osteoclast, with bone below it, showing typical distinguishing characteristics: a large cell with multiple nuclei and a "foamy" cytosol.

== See also ==
- Biomineralization, the general class of forming and maintaining mineralized tissues
- Tissue remodeling
- Wolff's law
