= Parafollicular cell =

Neuroendocrine cells in the thyroid

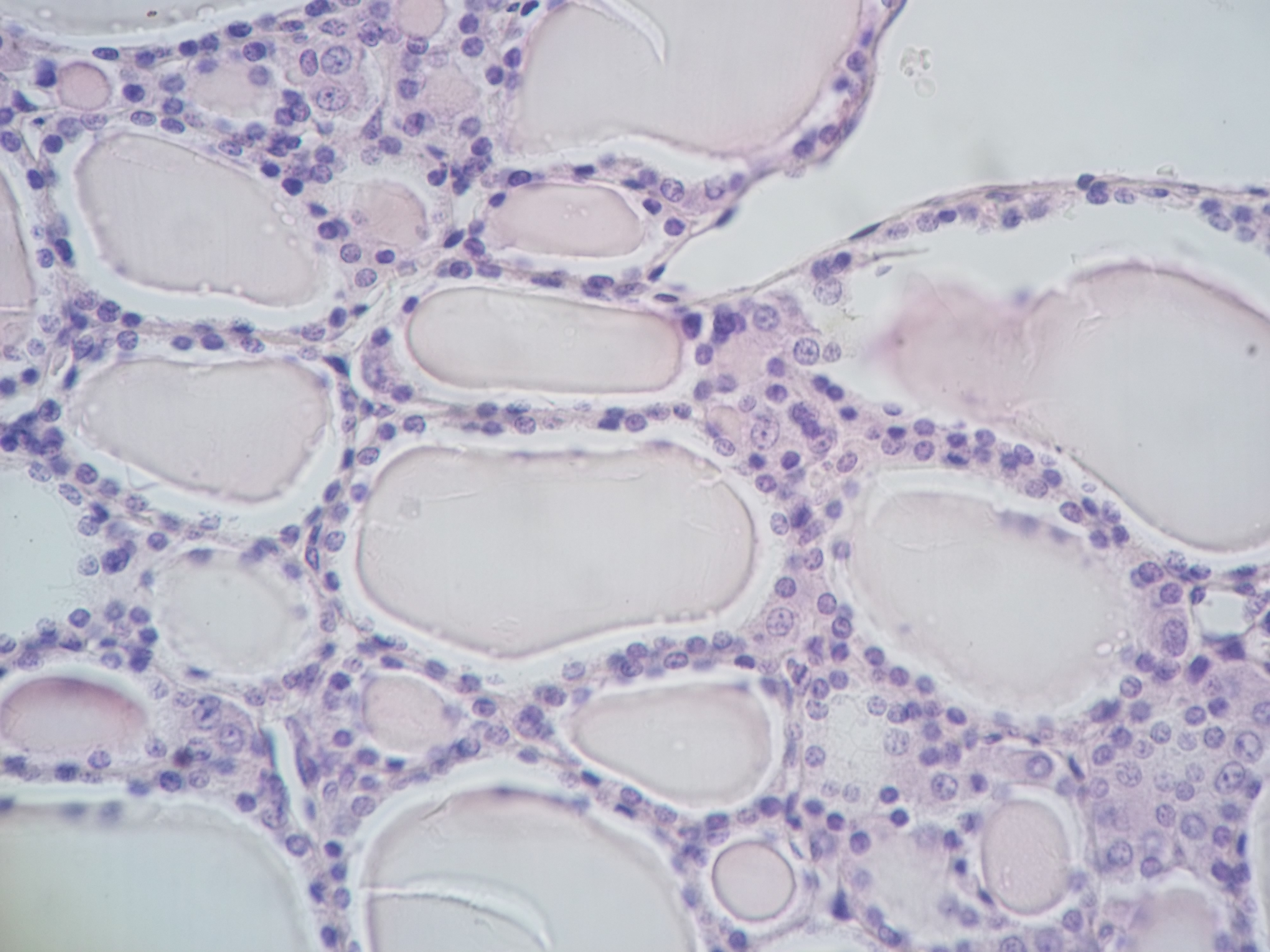
- Microscopic section of the thyroid showing follicles lined by follicular epithelial cells, and in between them larger parafollicular cells.

Details
- Location: Thyroid
- Function: Calcitonin secretion

Identifiers
- TH: H3.08.02.4.00009
- FMA: 68653

Parafollicular cells, also called C cells, are neuroendocrine cells in the thyroid. They are called C cells because the primary function of these cells is to secrete calcitonin. They are located adjacent to the thyroid follicles and reside in the connective tissue. These cells are large and have a pale stain compared with the follicular cells. In birds and teleost fishes these cells occupy a structure outside the thyroid gland named the ultimopharyngeal body.

== Structure ==
Parafollicular cells are pale-staining cells found in small number in the thyroid and are typically situated basally in the epithelium, without direct contact with the follicular lumen. They are always situated within the basement membrane, which surrounds the entire follicle.

=== Development ===
Parafollicular cells are derived from pharyngeal endoderm. Embryologically, they associate with the ultimopharyngeal body, which is a ventral derivative of the fourth (or fifth) pharyngeal pouch. Parafollicular cells were previously believed to be derived from the neural crest based on a series of experiments in quail-chick chimeras. However, lineage tracing experiments in mice revealed that parafollicular cells are derived from the endoderm origin.

== Function ==
Parafollicular cells secrete calcitonin, a hormone that participates in the regulation of calcium metabolism. Calcitonin lowers blood levels of calcium by inhibiting the resorption of bone by osteoclasts, and its secretion is increased proportionally with the concentration of calcium.

Parafollicular cells are also known to secrete in smaller quantities several neuroendocrine peptides such as serotonin, somatostatin or CGRP. They may also have a role in regulating thyroid hormones production locally, as they express thyrotropin-releasing hormone.

== Clinical significance ==
When parafollicular cells become cancerous, they lead to medullary carcinoma of the thyroid.

== See also ==
- List of human cell types derived from the germ layers
- List of distinct cell types in the adult human body
