= Ultimopharyngeal body =

Small organ found in the neck region

Details
- Precursor: fourth pharyngeal pouch
- Gives rise to: parafollicular cells

Identifiers
- Latin: corpus ultimopharyngeum
- MeSH: D014460
- TE: body_by_E5.4.2.0.0.1.21 E5.4.2.0.0.1.21

The ultimopharyngeal body, or ultimobranchial body or ultimobranchial gland is a small organ found in the neck region of many animals. In humans, it develops from the fourth pharyngeal pouch into the parafollicular cells of the thyroid to produce calcitonin. It may not develop in DiGeorge syndrome.

== Structure ==
The ultimopharyngeal body is a small organ of the neck. It is found in many animals. In humans, it develops into other tissues.

=== Development ===
In humans, the ultimopharyngeal body is an embryological structure, and is a derivative of the ventral recess of the fourth pharyngeal pouch. It is technically from the fifth pharyngeal pouch, but this is rudimentary and merges with the fourth. It develops into the parafollicular cells of the thyroid. The cells that give rise to the parafollicular cells are derivatives of endoderm. Endoderm cells migrate and associate with the ultimopharyngeal body during development.

== Function ==
In humans, the ultimopharyngeal body develops into the parafollicular cells of the thyroid. These secrete calcitonin. In other animals, the ultimopharyngeal body may produce calcitonin.

== Clinical significance ==
The ultimopharyngeal body may not develop in DiGeorge syndrome.

== History ==
The ultimopharyngeal body may also be known as the ultimobranchial body or the ultimobranchial gland.
