= Bone loss =

Bone loss may refer to a number of entities:

- Osteopenia, a condition in which overall bone density decreases without causing symptoms
- Osteoporosis, a condition in which overall bone density decreases while causing symptoms
- Periodontitis, a condition in which the supporting bone around teeth exhibits resorption
