= Frax =

Frax or FraX or FRAX may refer to:

- Frax, a villain in the Power Rangers: Time Force fictional universe
- Frax, a character in the Bucky O'Hare fictional universe
- FraX, an abbreviation for Fragile X Syndrome or the associated gene
- FRAX, a tool for assessing risk of fracture due to osteoporosis developed by the University of Sheffield
- Frax, an abbreviation for Fractional Ownership
- Frax, an app for realtime fractal exploration
- FRAX, a fractional reserve stablecoin cryptocurrency
