= Trabecular bone score =

Measure of bone texture

The trabecular bone score is a measure of bone texture correlated with bone microarchitecture and a marker for the risk of osteoporosis. Introduced in 2008, its main projected use is alongside measures of bone density in better predicting fracture risk in people with metabolic bone problems.

== Need for a marker of microarchitecture ==
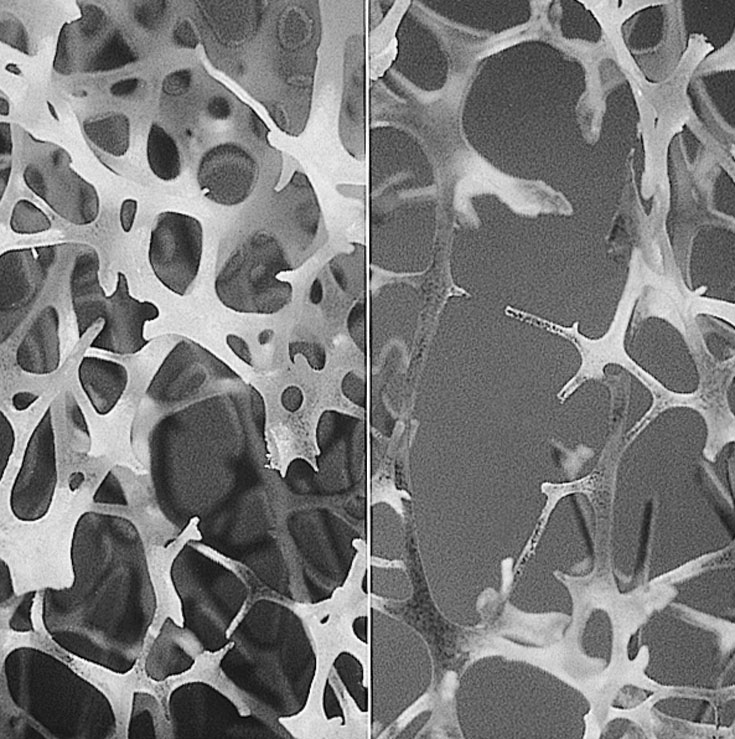
Microarchitecture of bone in health and in osteoporosis.

To diagnose osteoporosis, despite the inclusion of bone mineral density (BMD), biological markers and clinical factors of fracture risk, many undetected patients are at risk and many fractures are not explained. Bone mineral density is an assessment of the quantity of bone. It does not provide information on bone quality, another important parameter. In addition, clinical risk factors for fracture are at best an indirect assessment of the bone quality. One way to describe the quality of the bone is to assess its microarchitecture. Bone microarchitecture is related to the mechanical strength of bone and hence its greater or lesser risk of fracture. Indeed, for the same quantity of bone, different mechanically resistant bone structures may exist (few large trabeculae or numerous thin trabeculae that are mechanically stronger). Bone loss is often accompanied by a deterioration of bone architecture, resulting in a decreased number of trabeculae, increased inter-trabecular distance, and a loss connectivity of the trabecular meshwork. Moreover, reduction of cortical bone thickness and increased porosity accompany trabecular bone loss, and in particular increases the fragility of the femoral neck. Osteoporotic bone is called "porous".

== Technical ==
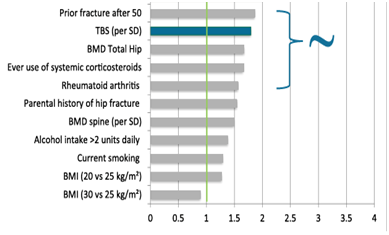
Relative Risk of TBS expressed by standard deviation and compared with relative risks of major clinical risk factors for fracture

The trabecular bone score is a textural parameter that can be applied to DEXA, which quantifies the local variations in gray level. TBS is derived from the evaluation of the experimental variogram, obtained from the grayscale DEXA.

It was found that TBS is a reflection of the structural condition of the bone microarchitecture. TBS is strongly correlated with the number of trabeculae and their connectivity and negatively with the space between trabeculae. That is to say that a high TBS value means that microarchitecture bone is dense, well connected with little spaces between trabeculaes. Conversely, a low TBS value means that the microarchitecture of bone is incomplete and poorly connected with wide spaces between trabeculae.

== Clinical use ==
From a clinical standpoint, TBS provides:

- assessment the risk of fracture;
- in combination with BMD, increase the number of patients at risk (correctly) identified;
- improvement the management of patients with secondary osteoporosis;
- follow-up of the evolution of microarchitecture of a patient over time;
- monitoring of the effect of anti-resorptive or anabolic.

All these studies have shown that TBS can be used as a clinical risk factor for osteoporotic fracture since it is reversible (with or without treatment), quantitative and independent of BMD. It should therefore be used as such in the same way that taking corticosteroids, rheumatoid arthritis or prevalent fracture after age 50.

The FRAX calculator has an option to include TBS for a TBS adjusted FRAX risk score. The calculated probabilities of fracture have been shown to be more accurate when computed including TBS.

As TBS relies on measurement of soft tissue, it is considered unreliable in individuals with a BMI over 37, or with extremely high waist circumference.
