= Digital X-ray radiogrammetry =

Method of measuring bone mineral density

- Synonyms: DXR
- [edit on Wikidata]

Digital X-ray radiogrammetry is a method for measuring bone mineral density (BMD). Digital X-ray radiogrammetry is based on the old technique of radiogrammetry. In DXR, the cortical thickness of the three middle metacarpal bones of the hand is measured in a digital X-ray image. Through a geometrical operation, the thickness is converted to bone mineral density. The BMD is corrected for porosity of the bone, estimated by a texture analysis performed on the cortical part of the bone.

Like other technologies for estimating the bone mineral density, the outputs are an areal BMD value, a T-score and a Z-score for assessing osteoporosis and the risk of bone fracture.

Digital X-ray radiogrammetry is primarily used in combination with digital mammography for osteoporosis screening, where same mammography machine that is used to acquire breast X-ray images is also used to acquire a hand image for BMD measurement. Due to high precision, DXR is also used for monitoring change in bone mineral density over time. Recent studies have suggested that DXR is a promising alternative for DXA for determining low bone quality in children with suspected secondary low bone quality or osteoporosis.

== See also ==
- Dual-energy X-ray absorptiometry
