= DXL =

DXL may refer to:

- Destination XL Group, a specialty retailer of men's apparel
- Docetaxel, a chemotherapy medication
- Domino XML, a markup language used by IBM Notes
- DOORS Extension Language, a scripting language for IBM's Rational DOORS
- Dual X-ray absorptiometry and laser, a technique for calculating bone mineral density
