= DXR =

DXR may refer to:

- DXR, a class of locomotives in New Zealand
- Danbury Municipal Airport (IATA code), Danbury, Connecticut
- Digital X-ray radiogrammetry, a method for measuring bone mineral density
- Doxorubicin, an anthracycline antibiotic used in cancer chemotherapy
- DXP reductoisomerase, an enzyme
- DirectX Raytracing, a computer graphics interface for real-time raytracing
- Drivex, a Spanish auto racing team
