= Dexa =

DEXA or Dexa may refer to either:

- the steroid Dexamethasone
- DEXA or DXA, dual-energy X-ray absorptiometry
