= Dual X-ray absorptiometry and laser =

- Purpose: bone density studies for osteoporosis assessment

Dual X-ray absorptiometry and laser technique (DXL) in the area of bone density studies for osteoporosis assessment is an improvement to the DXA Technique, adding an exact laser measurement of the thickness of the region scanned. The addition of object thickness adds a third input to the two x-ray energies used by DXA, better solving the equation for bone and excluding more efficiently these soft tissues components.

== Background ==
The body consists of three main components: bone mineral, lean soft tissue (skin, blood, water and skeletal muscle) and adipose tissue (fat and yellow bone marrow). These different components have different x-ray attenuating properties. The standard in bone mineral density scanning developed in the 1980s is called Dual X-ray Absorptiometry, known as DXA. The DXA technique uses two different x-ray energy levels to estimate bone density. DXA scans assume a constant relationship between the amounts of lean soft tissue and adipose tissue. This assumption leads to measurement errors, with an impact on accuracy as well as precision.

To reduce soft-tissue errors in DXA, DXL technology was developed in the late 1990s by a team of Swedish researchers led by Prof. Ragnar Kullenberg. With DXL technology, the region of interest is scanned using low and high energy x-rays as with a DXA scan. The improvement to DXA with DXL is that, for each pixel scanned by DXA, the exact thickness of the measured object is also measured using lasers. The DXL results allow for a more accurate estimation of bone density by using three separate inputs (low and high x-ray energies plus thickness) rather than two for each pixel in the measuring region.

== DXL - Technical description ==
Using the DXL technique, for each measuring point (or pixel) the following equations apply:

N1 = N01⋅exp(-(νb1⋅tb⋅σb + νs1⋅ts⋅σs + νf1⋅tf⋅σf))

N2 = N02⋅exp(-(νb2⋅tb⋅σb + νs2⋅ts⋅σs + νf2⋅tf⋅σf))

T = tb + ts + tf

Where:

- N1 and N2 are the detected x-ray counts after passing through the region of interest.
- N01 and N02 are the detected x-ray counts taken from the internal phantom.
- tb, ts and tf are the thickness of bone (b), lean soft tissue (s) and adipose tissue (f), respectively.
- T is the total thickness at the measuring point.
- νb1, νs1 and νf1 are the x-ray attenuation coefficients for each component at the low x-ray energy level.
- νb2, νs2 and νf2 are the x-ray attenuation coefficients for each component at the high x-ray energy level.
- σb, σs and σf are the densities of bone, lean soft tissue and adipose tissue, respectively.

tb * σb is the unknown bone density that one wants to calculate, e.g. areal mass (g/cm2).

== DXL technology used in clinical practice ==
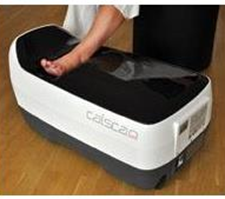
DXL Calscan Bone densitometry

The DXL technique is used in the bone densitometry system DXL Calscan, manufactured and marketed by the company Demetech AB, Täby, Sweden. Many published studies have evaluated the DXL technique using the DXL Calscan system, which scans the subject's heel. Several published fracture studies have shown that heel scans using DXL Calscan have an ability to predict fractures as well or better than the DXA technique scanning the hip.

== General and cited references ==
- Demetech AB webpage
