= Osteopenia =

Abnormally low bone mineral density

- Other names: Low bone mass, low bone density
- Specialty: Rheumatology, Endocrinology
- Symptoms: Usually asymptomatic
- Complications: Development into Osteoporosis
- Risk factors: Old age, European or Asian ethnicity, alcoholism, smoking, low body mass index
- Diagnostic method: Bone density scan
- Prevention: Adequate Vitamin D and calcium, regular weight bearing exercise, avoiding excessive alcohol and smoking
- Treatment: Usually unmerited
- Medication: Usually unmerited

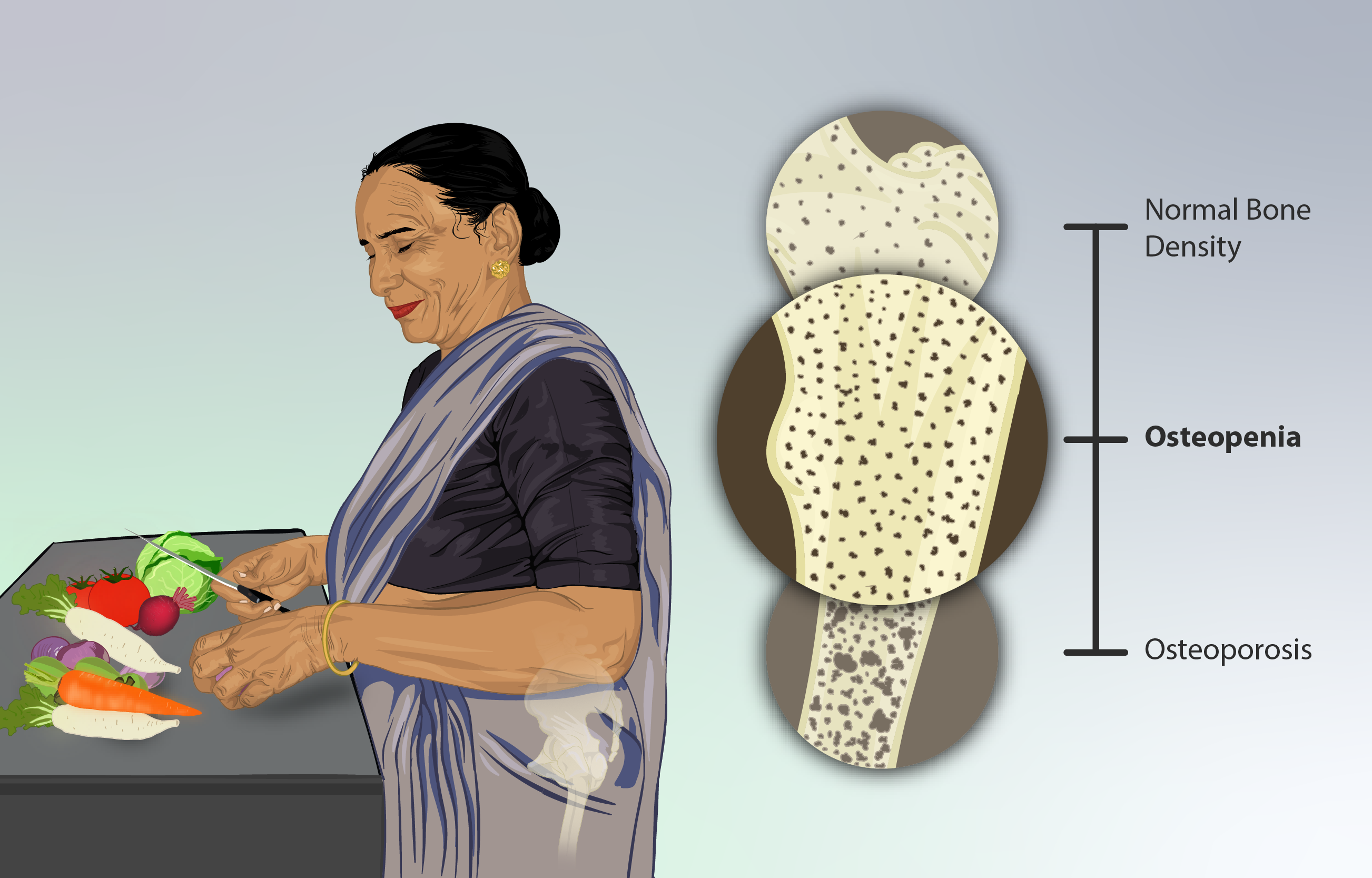
Osteopenia exists on a spectrum of normal to dangerously low bone density (osteoporosis).

Osteopenia, also called low bone mass or low bone density, is a condition in which bone density is low. Because their bones are weaker, people with osteopenia may have a higher risk of fractures, and some people may go on to develop the more serious condition of osteoporosis. In 2010, 43 million older adults in the US had osteopenia. Unlike osteoporosis, osteopenia usually does not cause noticeable symptoms because losing bone density itself does not cause pain.

There is no single cause of osteopenia, although there are several risk factors, including modifiable (behavioral, including dietary and use of certain drugs) and non-modifiable (for instance, loss of bone mass with age). For people with risk factors, measuring bone density using dual-energy X-ray absorptiometry (DXA or DEXA) can help to measure the development and progression of low bone density.

Prevention of low bone density can begin early in life by eating a healthful diet, doing weight-bearing exercise, minimizing alcoholic beverages, and not smoking tobacco.

The treatment of osteopenia is controversial. Non-pharmaceutical treatment tries to preserve existing bone mass using the above-described healthful behaviors. Pharmaceutical treatment for osteopenia, such as bisphosphonates and other medications, may be considered in certain cases, but that is not without risks. Treatment decisions should be guided by considering the patient's risk factors for fractures.

== Risk factors ==
Many divide risk factors for osteopenia into fixed (non-changeable) and modifiable factors. Osteopenia can also be secondary to other diseases. An incomplete list of risk factors:

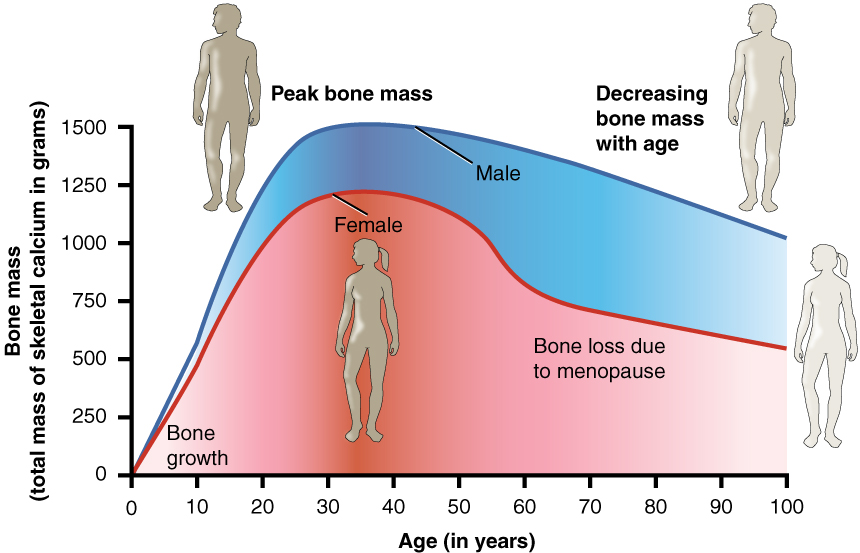
Bone density peaks at 35 and then decreases with age.

=== Fixed ===
- Age: bone density peaks at age 35, and then decreases. Bone density loss occurs in both men and women
- Ethnicity: European and Asian people have increased risk
- Sex: women are at higher risk, particularly those with early menopause
- Family history: low bone mass in the family increases risk

=== Modifiable / behavioral ===
- Tobacco
- Alcohol
- Inactivity – particularly lack of weight-bearing or resistance activities
- Insufficient caloric intake – osteopenia can be connected to female athlete triad syndrome, which occurs in female athletes as a combination of energy deficiency, menstrual irregularities, and low bone mineral density.
- Low nutrient diet (particularly calcium, Vitamin D)

=== Other diseases ===
- Celiac disease, via poor absorption of calcium and vitamin D
- Hyperthyroidism
- Anorexia nervosa

=== Medications ===
- Steroids
- Anticonvulsants

== Screening and diagnosis ==
The ISCD (International Society for Clinical Densitometry) and the National Osteoporosis Foundation recommend that older adults (women over 65 and men over 70) and adults with risk factors for low bone mass, or previous fragility fractures, undergo DXA testing. The DXA (dual X-ray absorptiometry) scan uses a form of X-ray technology, and offers accurate bone mineral density results with low radiation exposure.

The United States Preventive Services Task Force recommends osteoporosis screening for women with increased risk over 65 and states there is insufficient evidence to support screening men. The main purpose of screening is to prevent fractures. Of note, USPSTF screening guidelines are for osteoporosis, not specifically osteopenia.

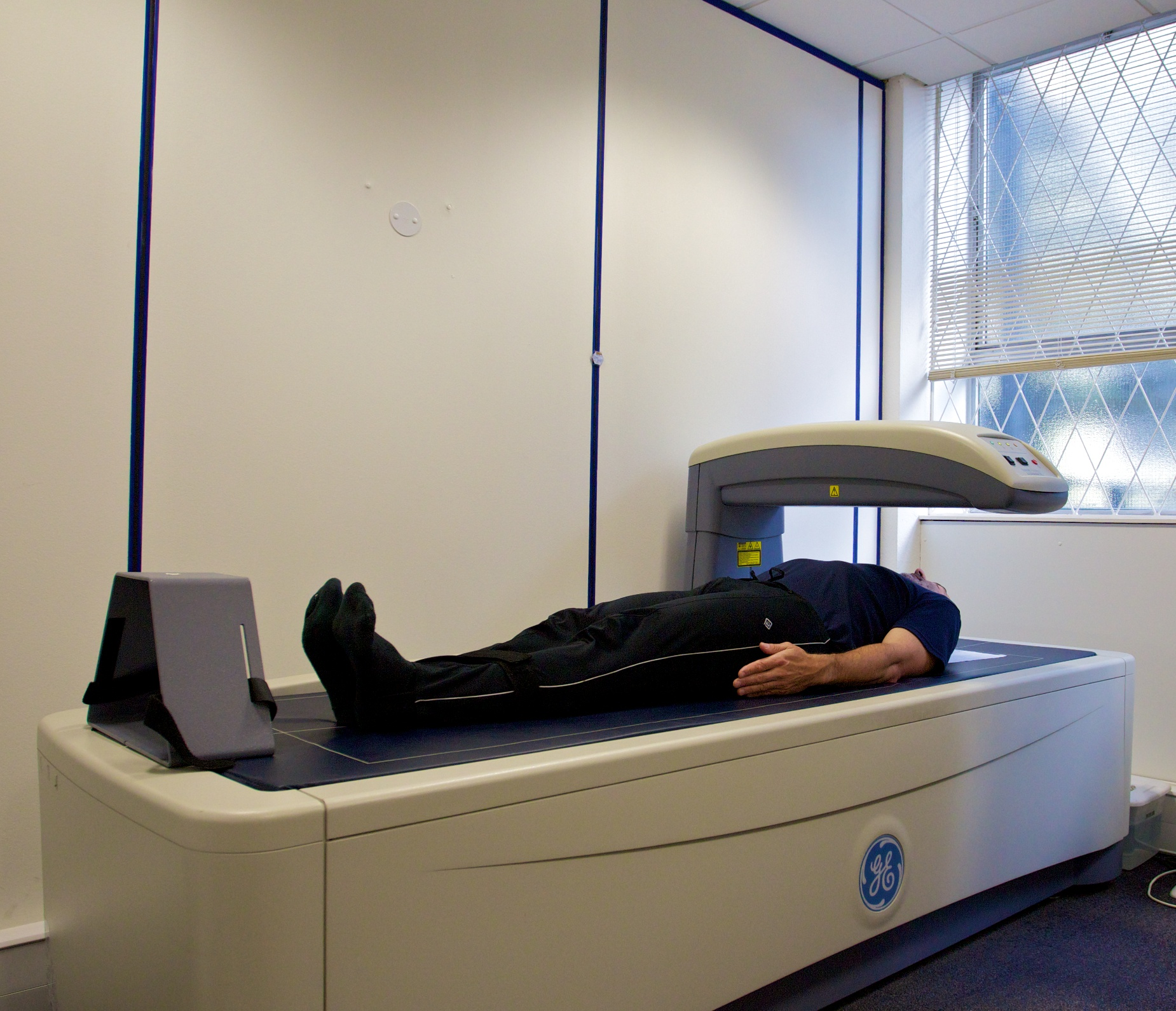
A DXA scanner in use.

The National Osteoporosis Foundation recommends use of central (hip and spine) DXA testing for accurate measure of bone density, emphasizing that peripheral or "screening" scanners should not be used to make clinically meaningful diagnoses and that peripheral and central DXA scans cannot be compared to each other.

DXA scanners can be used to diagnose osteopenia or osteoporosis as well as to measure bone density over time as people age or undergo medical treatment or lifestyle changes.

Information from the DXA scanner creates a bone mineral density T-score by comparing a patient's density to the bone density of a healthy young person. Bone density between 1 and 2.5 standard deviations below the reference, or a T-score between −1.0 and −2.5, indicates osteopenia (a T-score smaller than or equal to −2.5 indicates osteoporosis). Calculation of the T-score itself may not be standardized. The ISCD recommends using Caucasian women between 20 and 29 years old as the baseline for bone density for ALL patients, but not all facilities follow this recommendation.

The ISCD recommends that Z-scores, not T-scores, be used to classify bone density in premenopausal women and men under 50.

== Prevention ==
Prevention of low bone density can start early in life by maximizing peak bone density. Once a person loses bone density, the loss is usually irreversible, so preventing (greater than normal) bone loss is important.

Actions to maximize bone density and stabilize loss include:

- Exercise, particularly weight-bearing exercise, resistance exercises and balance exercises, through mechanical loading that promotes increased bone mass, and reduced fall risk
- Adequate caloric intake
- Sufficient calcium in diet: older adults may have increased calcium needs—of note, medical conditions such as Celiac and hyperthyroidism can affect absorption of calcium
- Sufficient Vitamin D in diet
- Estrogen replacement
- Avoidance of steroid medications
- Limit alcohol use and smoking

== Treatment ==
The pharmaceutical treatment of osteopenia is controversial and more nuanced than well-supported recommendations for improved nutrition and weight-bearing exercise. The diagnosis of osteopenia in and of itself does not always warrant pharmaceutical treatment. Many people with osteopenia may be advised to follow risk prevention measures (as above).

Risk of fracture guides clinical treatment decisions: the World Health Organization (WHO) Fracture Risk Assessment Tool (FRAX) estimates the probability of hip fracture and the probability of a major osteoporotic fracture (MOF), which could occur in a bone other than the hip. In addition to bone density (T-score), calculation of the FRAX score involves age, body characteristics, health behaviors, and other medical history.

As of 2014, The National Osteoporosis Foundation (NOF) recommends pharmaceutical treatment for osteopenic postmenopausal women and men over 50 with FRAX hip fracture probability of >3% or FRAX MOF probability >20%. As of 2016, the American Association of Clinical Endocrinologists and the American College of Endocrinology agree. In 2017, the American College of Physicians recommended that clinicians use individual judgment and knowledge of patients' particular risk factors for fractures, as well as patient preferences, to decide whether to pursue pharmaceutical treatment for women with osteopenia over 65.

Pharmaceutical treatment for low bone density includes a range of medications. Commonly used drugs include bisphosphonates (alendronate, risedronate, and ibandronate)—some studies show decreased fracture risk and increased bone density after bisphosphonate treatment for osteopenia. Other medications include selective estrogen receptor modulators (SERMs) (e.g., raloxifene), estrogens (e.g., estradiol), calcitonin, and parathyroid hormone-related protein analogues (e.g., abaloparatide, teriparatide).

These drugs are not without risks. In this complex landscape, many argue that clinicians must consider a patient's individual risk of fracture, not simply treat those with osteopenia as equally at risk. A 2005 editorial in the Annals of Internal Medicine states "The objective of using osteoporosis drugs is to prevent fractures. This can be accomplished only by treating patients who are likely to have a fracture, not by simply treating T-scores."

== History ==
Osteopenia, from Greek ὀστέον (ostéon), "bone" and πενία (penía), "poverty", is a condition of sub-normally mineralized bone, usually the result of a rate of bone lysis that exceeds the rate of bone matrix synthesis. See also osteoporosis.

In June 1992, the World Health Organization defined osteopenia. An osteoporosis epidemiologist at the Mayo Clinic who participated in setting the criterion in 1992 said "It was just meant to indicate the emergence of a problem", and noted that "It didn't have any particular diagnostic or therapeutic significance. It was just meant to show a huge group who looked like they might be at risk."

== See also ==
- Bone mineral density
- Osteoporosis
