= Bone density =

Amount of bone mineral in bone tissue

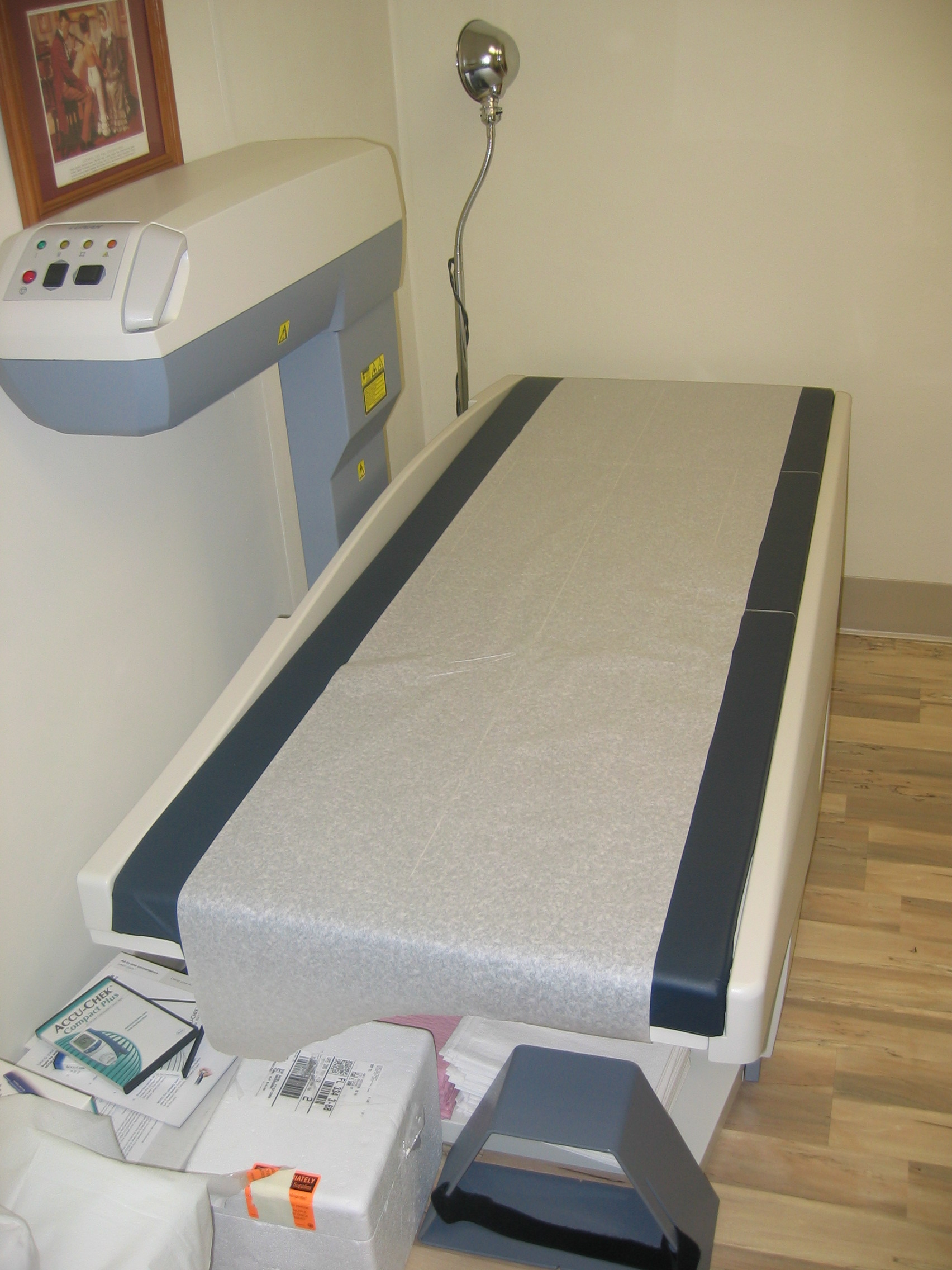
A scanner used to measure bone density using dual energy X-ray absorptiometry

Bone density, or bone mineral density (BMD), is the amount of bone mineral in bone tissue, measured as mass of mineral per volume of bone (relating to density). Clinically it is measured by proxy according to optical density per square centimetre of bone surface upon imaging. Bone density measurement is used in clinical medicine as an indirect indicator of osteoporosis and fracture risk. It is measured by a procedure called densitometry, often performed in the radiology or nuclear medicine departments of a hospital or clinic. The measurement is painless and non-invasive with low radiation exposure. Measurements are usually made over the lumbar spine and the upper part of the hip. The forearm may be scanned if the hip and lumbar spine are not accessible.

There is a statistical association between poor bone density and a higher probability of fracture. Fractures of the legs and pelvis due to falls are a significant public health problem, especially in elderly women, leading to substantial medical costs, inability to live independently, and even risk of death. Bone density measurements are used to screen people for osteoporosis risk and to identify those who might benefit from measures to improve bone strength.

Volumetrically, women have greater bone density than men, as their bones are often not as long as men's bones.

== Testing ==
A bone density test may detect osteoporosis or osteopenia. The usual response to either of these indications is consultation with a physician. Bone density tests are not recommended for people without risk factors for weak bones, which is more likely to result in unnecessary treatment rather than discovery of a weakness.

=== Indications for testing ===
The risk factors for low bone density and primary considerations for a bone density test include:

- females age 65 or older.
- males age 70 or older.
- people over age 50 with:
  - previous bone fracture from minor trauma.
  - rheumatoid arthritis.
  - low body weight.
  - a parent with a hip fracture.
- individuals with vertebral abnormalities.
- individuals receiving, or planning to receive, long-term glucocorticoid (steroid) therapy.
- individuals with primary hyperparathyroidism.
- individuals being monitored to assess the response or efficacy of an approved osteoporosis drug therapy.
- when androgen deprivation therapy is being planned for prostate cancer.
- individuals with a history of eating disorders.

Other considerations that are related to the risk of low bone density and the need for a test include smoking habits, drinking habits, the long-term use of corticosteroid drugs, and a vitamin D deficiency.

=== Test result terms ===
Results of the test are reported in three forms:

- Measured areal density in g cm^{−2}.
- Z-score: the number of standard deviations above or below the mean for the patient's age, sex and ethnicity.
- T-score: the number of standard deviations above or below the mean for a healthy 30-year-old adult of the same sex and ethnicity as the patient.

=== Types of tests ===
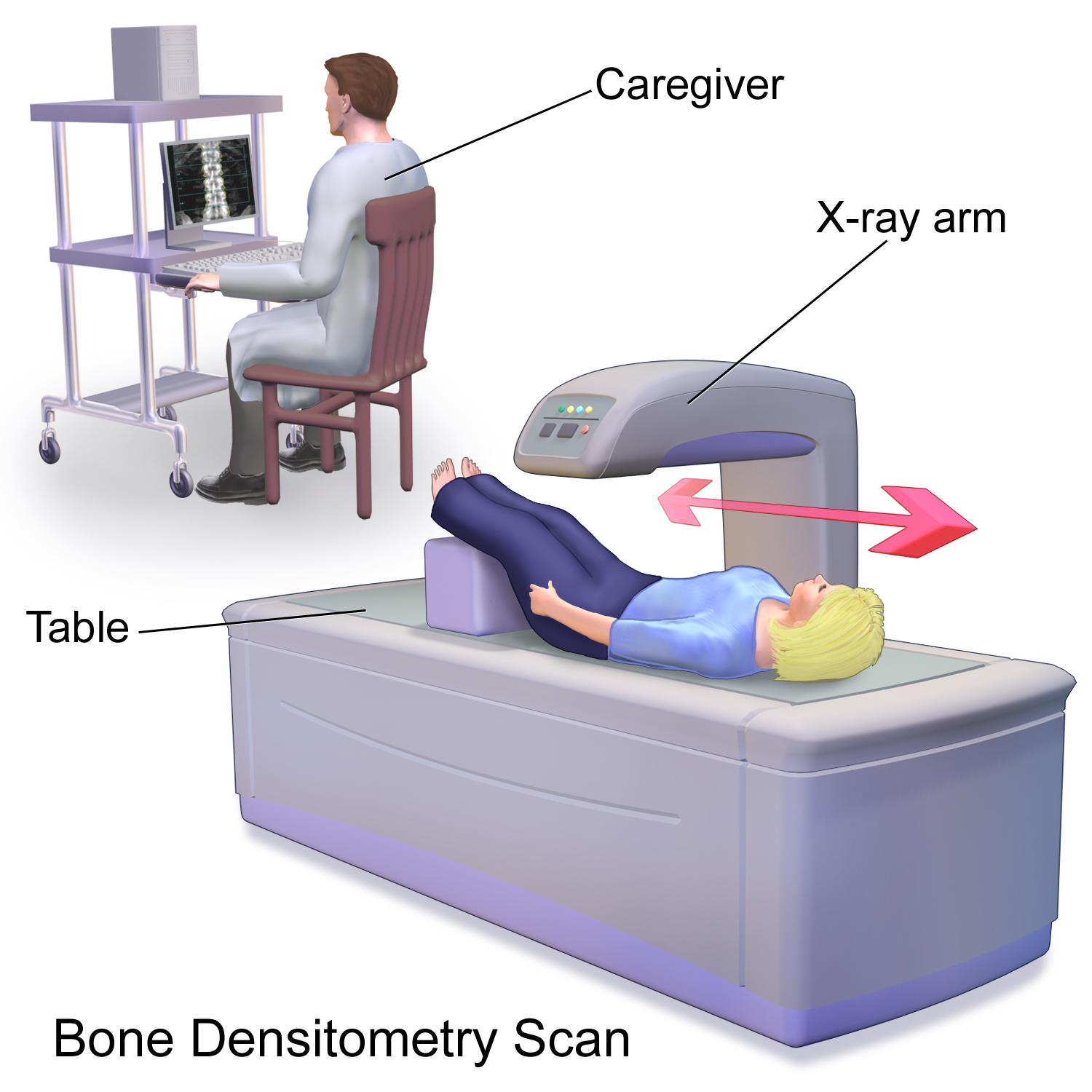
Illustration of Bone Densitometry Scan

While there are many types of bone mineral density tests, all are non-invasive. The tests differ according to which bones are measured to determine the test result.

These tests include:

- Dual-energy X-ray absorptiometry (DXA or DEXA)
- Trabecular bone score
- Dual X-ray Absorptiometry and Laser (DXL)
- Quantitative computed tomography (QCT)
- Quantitative ultrasound (QUS)
- Single photon absorptiometry (SPA)
- Dual photon absorptiometry (DPA)
- Digital X-ray radiogrammetry (DXR)
- Single energy X-ray absorptiometry (SEXA)

DXA is the most commonly used testing method as of 2016. The DXA test works by measuring a specific bone or bones, usually the spine, hip, and wrist. The density of these bones is then compared with an average index based on age, sex, and size. The resulting comparison is used to determine the risk for fractures and the stage of osteoporosis (if any) in an individual.

Quantitative ultrasound (QUS) has been described as a more cost-effective approach for measuring bone density, as compared to DXA.

Average bone mineral density = BMC / W [g/cm^{2}]

- BMC = bone mineral content = g/cm
- W = width at the scanned line

=== Interpretation ===
Results are generally scored by two measures, the T-score and the Z-score. Scores indicate the amount one's bone mineral density varies from the mean. Negative scores indicate lower bone density, and positive scores indicate higher.

Less than 0.5% of patients who underwent DXA-scanning were found to have a T- or Z-score of more than +4.0, often the cause of an unusually high bone mass (HBM) and associated with mild skeletal dysplasia and the inability to float in water.

==== T-score ====
The T-score is the relevant measure when screening for osteoporosis. It is the bone mineral density at the site when compared to the "young normal reference mean". It is a comparison of a patient's bone mineral density to that of a healthy 30-year-old. The US standard is to use data for a 30-year-old of the same sex and ethnicity, but the WHO recommends using data for a 30-year-old white female for everyone. Values for 30-year-olds are used in post-menopausal women and men over age 50 because they better predict the risk of future fracture. The criteria of the World Health Organization are:

- Normal is a T-score of −1.0 or higher
- Osteopenia is defined as between −1.0 and −2.5
- Osteoporosis is defined as −2.5 or lower, meaning a bone density that is two and a half standard deviations below the mean of a 30-year-old man/woman.

Hip fractures per 1000 patient-years
WHO category	Age 50–64	Age > 64	Overall
Normal	5.3	9.4	6.6
Osteopenia	11.4	19.6	15.7
Osteoporosis	22.4	46.6	40.6

==== Z-score ====
The Z-score for bone density is the comparison to the "age-matched normal" and is usually used in cases of severe osteoporosis. This is the standard score or number of standard deviations a patient's bone mineral density differs from the average for their age, sex, and ethnicity. This value is used in premenopausal women, men under the age of 50, and in children and adolescents. It is most useful when the score is less than 2 standard deviations below this normal. In this setting, it is helpful to scrutinize for coexisting illnesses or treatments that may contribute to osteoporosis, such as glucocorticoid therapy, hyperparathyroidism, or alcoholism.

== Prevention ==
To prevent low bone density it is recommended to have sufficient calcium and vitamin D. Sufficient calcium is defined as 1,000 mg per day, increasing to 1,200 mg for women above 50 and men above 70. Sufficient vitamin D is defined as 600 IUs per day for adults 19 to 70, increasing to 800 IUs per day for those over 71. Exercise, especially weight-bearing and resistance exercises are most effective for building bone. Weight-bearing exercise includes walking, jogging, dancing, and hiking. Resistance exercise is often accomplished through lifting weights. Other therapies, such as estrogens (e.g., estradiol, conjugated estrogens), selective estrogen receptor modulators (e.g., raloxifene, bazedoxifene), and bisphosphonates (e.g., alendronic acid, risedronic acid), can also be used to improve or maintain bone density. Tobacco use and excessive alcohol consumption have detrimental effects on bone density. Excessive alcohol consumption is defined as more than one standard-sized alcoholic beverage per day for women, and drinking two or more alcoholic beverages per day for men.

== Genetics ==
Bone mineral density is highly variable between individuals. While there are many environmental factors that affect bone mineral density, genetic factors play the largest role. Bone mineral density variation has been estimated to have 0.6–0.8 heritability factor, meaning that 60–80% of its variation is inherited from parents. Because of the heritability of bone mineral density, family history of fractures is considered as a risk factor for osteoporosis. Bone mineral density is polygenic and many of the genetic mechanisms remain poorly understood.

=== Genetic diseases associated with bone mineral density ===
There are several rare genetic diseases that have been associated with pathologic changes in bone mineral density. The table summarizes these diseases:

Disease	Gene affected	Inheritance	Source
Osteogenesis imperfecta	COLIA1	Autosomal recessive	
Osteogenesis imperfecta	COLIA2	Autosomal recessive	
Osteoporosis pseudoglioma syndrome	LRP5	Autosomal recessive	
Osteopetrosis	TCIRGI	Autosomal recessive	
Camurati-Engelmann disease	TGFβ-1	Autosomal recessive	
Van Buchem disease	SOST	Autosomal recessive	
Severe infantile osteopetrosis	CLCN7	Autosomal recessive	
