= Dual-energy X-ray absorptiometry =

Diagnostic test for bone mineral density testing

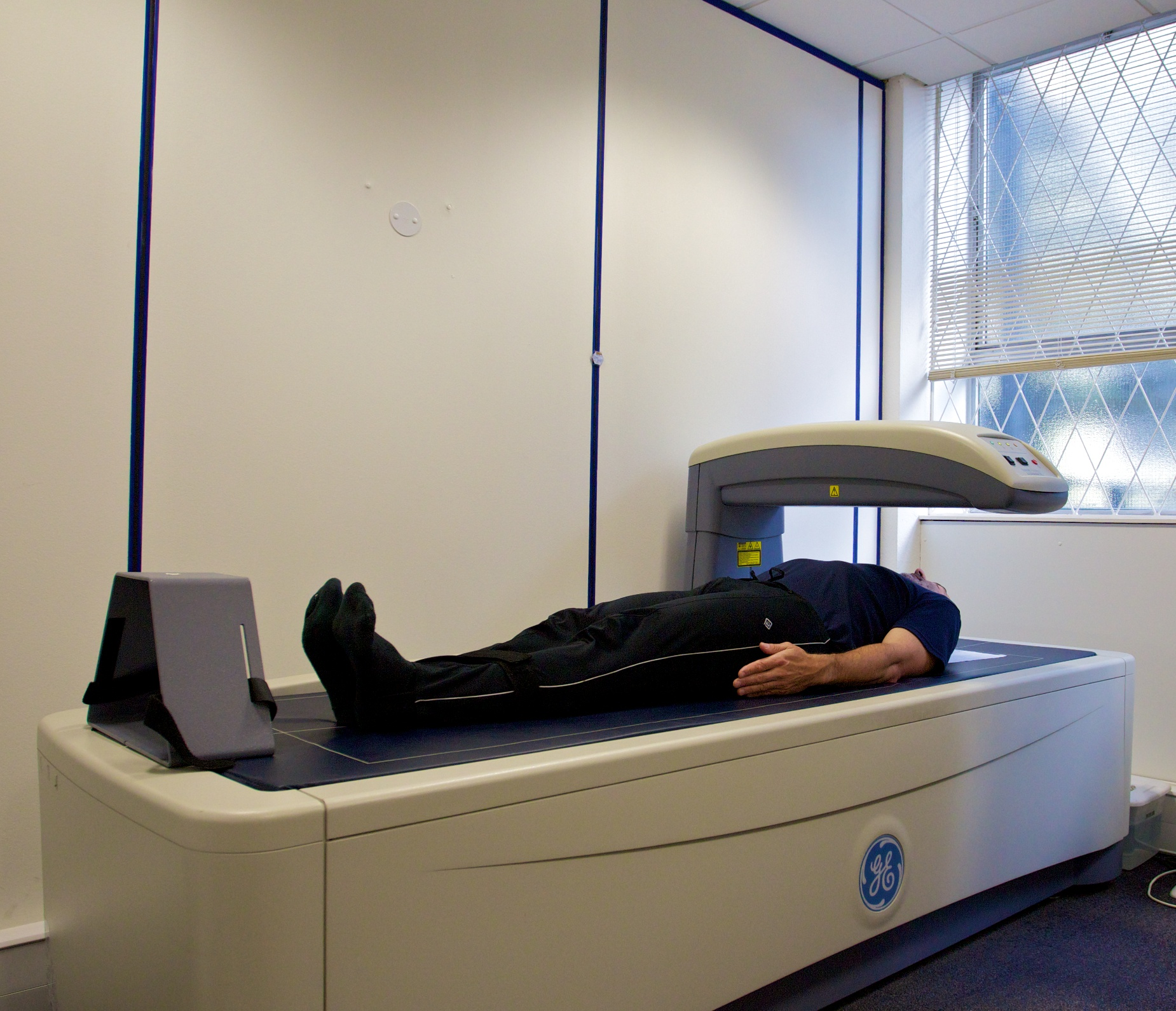
- OPS-301 code: 3-900

Dual-energy X-ray absorptiometry (DXA or DEXA; also BMD test, bone density test, bone densitometry, p-DEXA) is a means of measuring bone mineral density (BMD) with spectral imaging. Two X-ray beams, with different energy levels, are aimed at the patient's bones. When soft tissue absorption is subtracted, the bone mineral density (BMD) can be determined from the absorption of each beam by bone. Dual-energy X-ray absorptiometry is the most widely used bone density measurement technology.

The DXA scan is typically used to diagnose and follow osteopenia and osteoporosis, as contrasted to the nuclear bone scan, which is sensitive to certain metabolic diseases of bones in which bones are trying to heal from infections, fractures, or tumors. It is also sometimes used to assess body composition.

== Physics ==
=== X-ray attenuation at multiple energy levels ===
As an X-ray beam passes through a homogeneous material, the intensity at depth $t$ within the material can be described with the Beer-Lambert law:
$$I(t) = I_0 e^{-\mu t},$$
where $I_0$ is the initial beam intensity and $\mu$ is the linear attenuation coefficient. For DXA, the above equation is often expressed in terms of the mass attenuation coefficient (the attenuation coefficient divided by the density of the material $\rho$):
$$I(t) = I_0 e^{-\mu t} = I_0 e^{-(\frac{\mu}{\rho}) t \rho} = I_0 e^{-(\frac{\mu}{\rho}) \sigma},$$
where $(\mu / \rho)$ is the mass attenuation coefficient, and $\sigma$ is the area density. For a non-homogeneous material with $n$ separate materials, the absorption relationship is given by:
$$I = I_0 e^{-\sum^{n}_{i=1}(\frac{\mu}{\rho})_i \sigma_i},$$
where $(\mu / \rho)_i$ and $\sigma_i$ are the mass attenuation coefficient and area density of material $i$, respectively.

Soft tissue and bone have different attenuation coefficients for X-rays. A single X-ray beam passing through the body is attenuated by both soft tissue and bone, and it is not possible to determine from a single beam how much attenuation is attributable to the bone. However, attenuation coefficients vary with the energy of the X-rays, and, crucially, the ratio of the attenuation coefficients also varies.

Consider a sample containing a mixture of bone and soft tissue. In the simplified case of two monochromatic X-ray beams, the absorption of the higher and lower energy X-ray beams are given by:

$I^{H} = I^{H}_0 e^{-((\frac{\mu}{\rho})^{H}_{b}\sigma_b + (\frac{\mu}{\rho})^{H}_{s}\sigma_s)}$,	Eq. 1

$I^{L} = I^{L}_0 e^{-((\frac{\mu}{\rho})^{L}_{b}\sigma_b + (\frac{\mu}{\rho})^{L}_{s}\sigma_s)}$	Eq. 2

where the superscripts $H$ and $L$ refer to the high and low energy beams, respectively, and the subscripts $b$ and $s$ refer to bone and soft tissue, respectively.

=== Direct density measurement ===
The area density of bone can be obtained by first re-arranging the two equations for $I^{L}$ and $I^{H}$, defined in Eq. 1 and Eq. 2, in terms of $\sigma_s$, setting them equal to each other, and re-arranging the resulting equation for $\sigma_b$:
$$\sigma_b = \frac{R_s\ln(I^{H}/I^{H}_0) -  \ln(I^{L}/I^{L}_0)}{(\mu/\rho)^{L}_b - R_s(\mu/\rho)^{H}_b},$$
where $R_s$ is the ratio of mass attenuation coefficients for soft tissue at the two energy levels
$$R_s = \frac{(\mu/\rho)^{L}_s}{(\mu/\rho)^{H}_s},$$
The area density of bone, $\sigma_b$, can thus be obtained by measuring $I^H$ and $I^L$, and using known values of $I_0^H$ and $I_0^L$ (dependent on the scanner) and known values of the mass attenuation coefficients of bone and soft tissue at the (known) high and low energy levels. The density of soft tissue, $\sigma_s$, can be obtained in a similar manner as above.

=== Estimating component fractions in mixtures of two materials ===
Consider a tissue sample containing a mixture of two materials with unknown fractions $f_1$ and $f_2$. Since there are only two materials, by definition $f_1 + f_2 = 1$. From Eq. 1 and Eq. 2 (replacing bone and soft tissue with the more general 1 and 2) define the ratio
$$R = \frac{\ln(I^{L}/I^{L}_0)}{\ln(I^{H}/I^{H}_0)}.$$
It can be shown that this is given by:

$R =\frac{(\frac{\mu}{\rho})^{L}_{1}f_1 + (\frac{\mu}{\rho})^{L}_{2}f_2}{(\frac{\mu}{\rho})^{H}_{1}f_1 + (\frac{\mu}{\rho})^{H}_{2}f_2}.$	Eq. 3

In the special case where only material 1 is present in the sample (i.e. $f_1=1, f_2=0$), then $R$ is just the ratio of the mass attenuation coefficients at those energy levels
$$R =\frac{(\frac{\mu}{\rho})^{L}_{1}}{(\frac{\mu}{\rho})^{H}_{1}}=R_1,$$
which is a constant value $R_1$ that can be calculated using known values of the mass attenuation coefficients of material 1 at the two energy levels. Likewise, the constant value $R_2$ can be calculated as the ratio of mass attenuation coefficients of material 2 at both energy levels, which can be seen by substituting $f_1=0, f_2=1$ into Eq. 3.

In body composition measurements, pixels in regions of the DXA image with no bone are considered to be a mixture of fat and lean soft tissue compartments. At higher energy levels (e.g. 70 KeV) the mass attenuation coefficients of both fat and lean soft tissue compartments are similar. Making the approximation that

$(\frac{\mu}{\rho})^{H}_{1} \approx (\frac{\mu}{\rho})^{H}_{2} = (\frac{\mu}{\rho})^{H}$	Eq. 4

and substituting into Eq. 3 gives
$$R \approx\frac{(\frac{\mu}{\rho})^{L}_{1}f_1 + (\frac{\mu}{\rho})^{L}_{2}f_2}{(\frac{\mu}{\rho})^{H}(f_1 + f_2)} = \frac{(\frac{\mu}{\rho})^{L}_{1}f_1 + (\frac{\mu}{\rho})^{L}_{2}f_2}{(\frac{\mu}{\rho})^{H}} = R_1 f_1 + R_2 f_2,$$
since by definition $f_1 + f_2 = 1$. Substituting $f_2 = 1 - f_1$ into the above and re-arranging gives
$$f_1 = \frac{R-R_2}{R_1-R_2}$$
and
$$f_2 = 1 - f_1 = \frac{R_1-R}{R_1-R_2}.$$
Thus, when the assumption in Eq. 4 holds the relative fractions of the two materials can be estimated using the measured value of $R$ and known values of $R_1$ and $R_2$.

=== Scanner characteristics ===
One type of DXA scanner uses a cerium filter with a tube voltage of 80 kV, resulting in effective photon energies of about 40 and 70 keV. Another type of DXA scanner uses a samarium filter with a tube voltage of 100 kV, which produces effective energies of 47 and 80 keV. Also, the tube voltage can be continuously switched between a low (for example 70 kV) and high (for example 140 kV) value in synchronism with the frequency of the electrical mains, resulting in effective energies alternating between 45 and 100 keV.

The combination of dual X-ray absorptiometry and laser uses the laser to measure the thickness of the region scanned, allowing for varying proportions of lean soft tissue and adipose tissue within the soft tissue to be controlled for and improving the accuracy.

=== Limitations compared to 3D techniques ===
Because DXA calculates BMD using area, it is not an accurate measurement of true bone mineral density, which is mass divided by a volume. To distinguish DXA BMD from volumetric bone-mineral density, researchers sometimes refer to DXA BMD as an areal bone mineral density (aBMD). The confounding effect of differences in bone size is due to the missing depth value in the calculation of bone mineral density. A consequence of dividing by area instead of volume is that BMD is overestimated in taller subjects, or those with larger bones, and underestimated in shorter subjects, or those with smaller bones.

Three-dimensional imaging modalities such as quantitative computed tomography (QCT), which measure volumetric bone mineral density (vBMD), have been shown to correlate more strongly with fracture risk than aBMD; however, both measures exhibit significant associations with fracture risk and are capable of discriminating between individuals with and without fractures. Compared with QCT, DXA scans are both cheaper and impart a lower dose of ionizing radiation to the patient.

To correct for the lack of depth information when calculating aBMD by dividing the bone mineral content by area, methods to correct for this by calculating a bone mineral apparent density (BMAD) score have been proposed. These attempt to account for bone size using geometric assumptions to account for various bone sizes, for example by dividing by $Area^{3/2}$ for the spinal vertebrae, and $Area^{2}$ for the femur, femoral neck and forearm.

== Bone density measurement ==
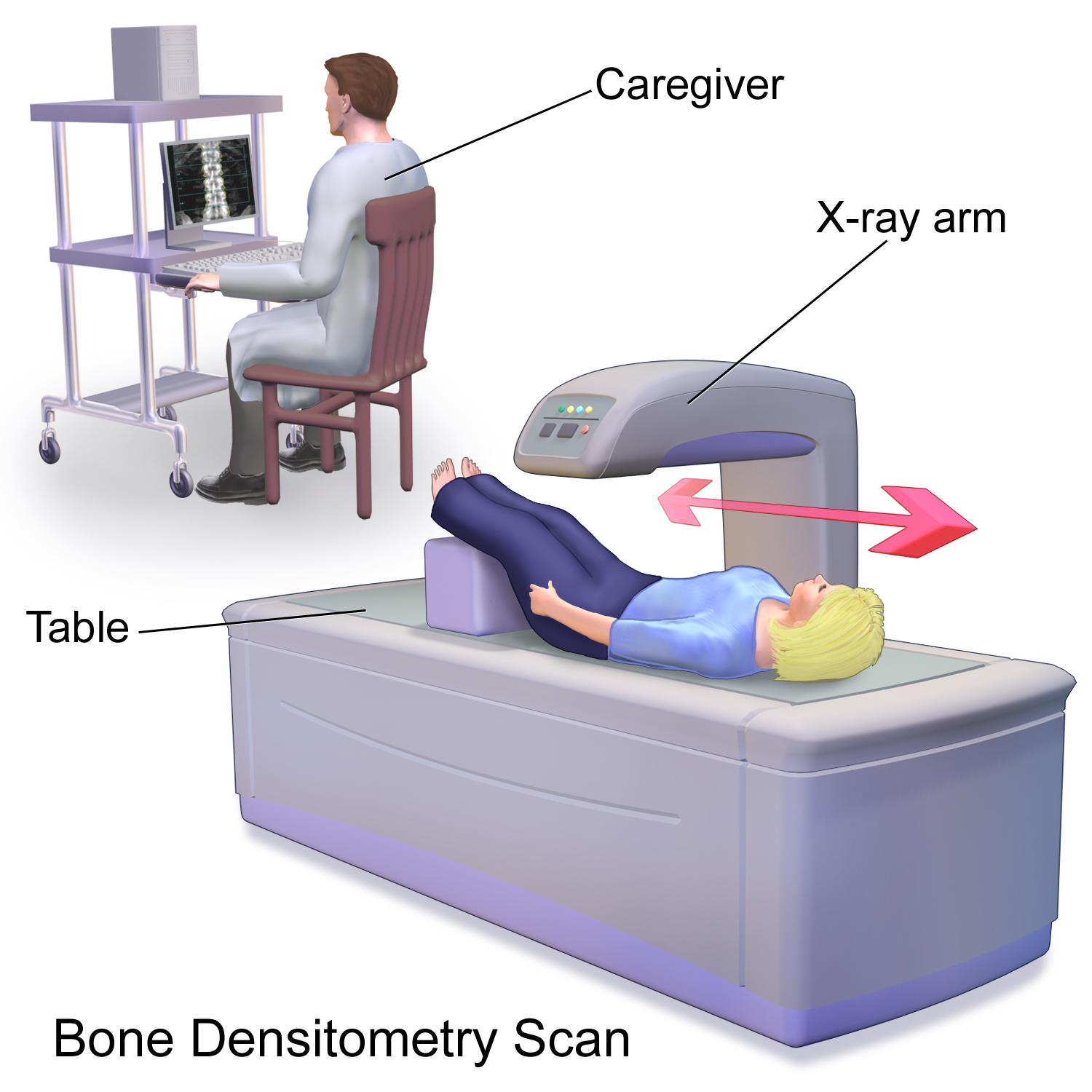

=== Indications ===
The U.S. Preventive Services Task Force recommends that women over the age of 65 should get a DXA scan. The age when men should be tested is uncertain, but some sources recommend age 70. At-risk women should consider getting a scan when their risk is equal to that of a normal 65-year-old woman.

A person's risk can be estimated with the University of Sheffield's FRAX calculator, which takes into account prior fragility fracture, use of glucocorticoids, heavy smoking, excess alcohol intake, rheumatoid arthritis, history of parental hip fracture, chronic renal and liver disease, chronic respiratory disease, long-term use of phenobarbital or phenytoin, celiac disease, inflammatory bowel disease, and other clinical risk factors.

=== Scoring ===
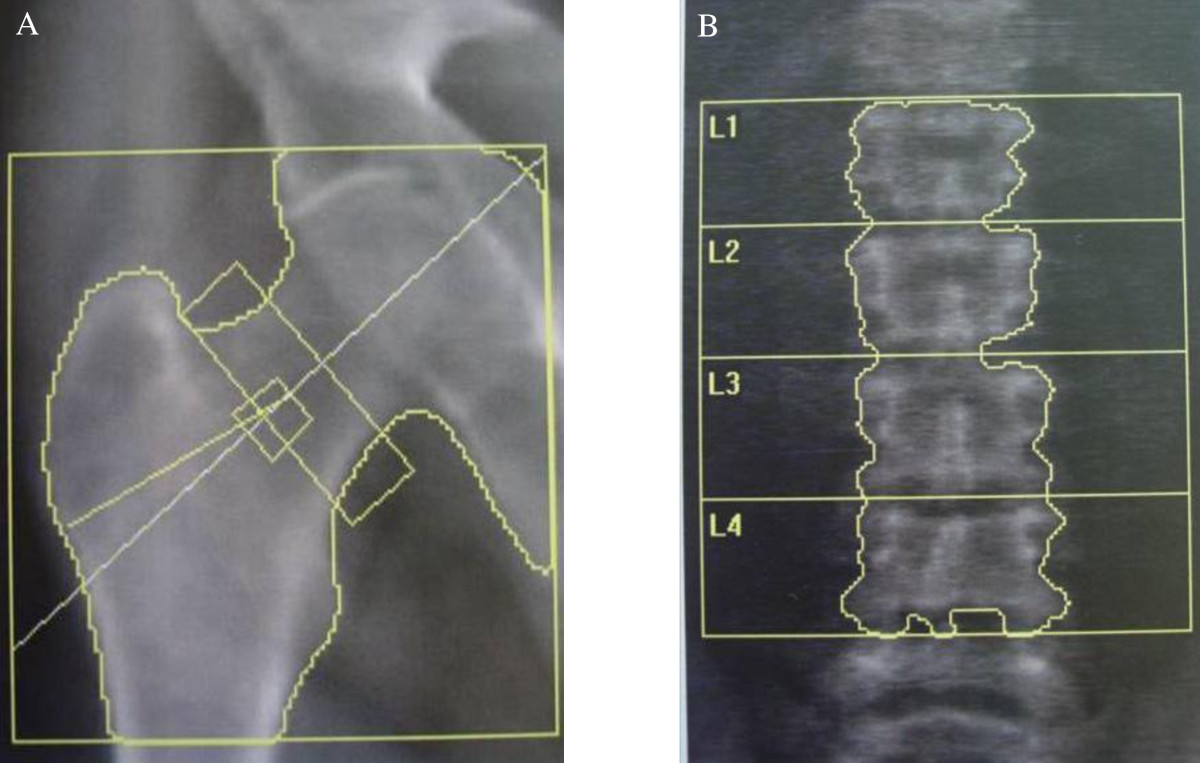
DEXA assessment of bone mineral density of the femoral neck (A) and the lumbar spine (B): T scores of - 4.2 and - 4.3 were found at the hip (A) and lumbar spine (B), respectively in a 53-year-old male patient affected with Fabry disease.

Bone mineral density (BMD) values are usually quoted as either T-scores or Z-scores. The T-score is the difference in a subject's BMD compared to the average of a young adult population of the same sex, expressed in standard deviations, while the Z-score is defined the number of standard deviations below the average BMD of a person of the same age and sex.

In 1994 a World Health Organization study group established T-score based criteria for diagnosing osteoperosis in post-menopausal women:

- $T \ge -1.0$: normal
- $-1.0 > T > -2.5$: osteopenia (mildly reduced BMD)
- $T \le -2.5$: osteoperosis

These values were determined using a reference population of young, healthy caucasian women. The International Society for Clinical Densitometry (ISCD) recommends that a uniform Caucasian (non-race adjusted) female reference database should be used to calculate T-scores for men and women of all ethnic groups. There is some debate over whether separate reference datasets should be used for different ethnic groups since BMD itself varies with ethnicity, with several studies suggesting that using a caucasian reference dataset leads to overdiagnosis of osteoperosis in East Asian and Indian populations. The ISCD also recommends Z-scores, and not T-scores, are used for premenopausal women, men under the age of 50 and children.

In 2025 the US Food and Drug Administration qualified total hip BMD from DXA as a validated surrogate endpoint to support clinical trials of investigational therapies for post-menopausal women with osteoporosis at risk for fracture.

Statistically significant differences in BMD measurements from DXA machines produced by different manufacturers have been reported. Because of this, calibration between scanners is recommended for multi-centre clinical trials. Furthermore, when an individual centre replaces a scanner, calibration between the old and new scanner is recommended to enable accurate longitudinal assessment.

Taking strontium supplements causes DEXA to overestimate bone mineral density, because strontium is a stronger absorber of X-rays than calcium.

DXA can also be used to measure the trabecular bone score.

=== Clinical practice in pediatrics ===
DXA is, by far, the most widely used technique for bone mineral density measurements, since it is relatively inexpensive, accessible, easy to use, and provides an accurate estimation of bone mineral density in adults.

The official position of the International Society for Clinical Densitometry (ISCD) is that a patient be tested for BMD if they have a condition that could precipitate bone loss, are to be prescribed pharmaceuticals known to cause bone loss, or are being treated and need reqiore monitoring. The ISCD states that there is no clearly understood correlation between BMD and the risk of a child's sustaining a fracture; the diagnosis of osteoporosis in children cannot be made on the basis of densitometry criteria. T-scores are prohibited with children and should not even appear on DXA reports. Thus, the WHO classification of osteoporosis and osteopenia in adults cannot be applied to children, but Z-scores can be used to assist diagnosis.

Some clinics may routinely carry out DXA scans on pediatric patients with conditions such as nutritional rickets, lupus, and Turner syndrome. DXA has been demonstrated to measure skeletal maturity and body fat composition and has been used to evaluate the effects of pharmaceutical therapy. It may also aid pediatricians in diagnosing and monitoring treatment of disorders of bone mass acquisition in childhood.

However, it seems that DXA is still in its early days in pediatrics, and there are widely acknowledged limitations and disadvantages with DXA. A view exists that DXA scans for diagnostic purposes should not even be performed outside specialist centers, and, if a scan is done outside one of these centers, it should not be interpreted without consultation with an expert in the field. Furthermore, most of the pharmaceuticals given to adults with low bone mass can be given to children only in strictly monitored clinical trials.

Whole-body calcium measured by DXA has been validated in adults using in-vivo neutron activation of total body calcium but this is not suitable for paediatric subjects and studies have been carried out on paediatric-sized animals.

== Body composition measurement ==
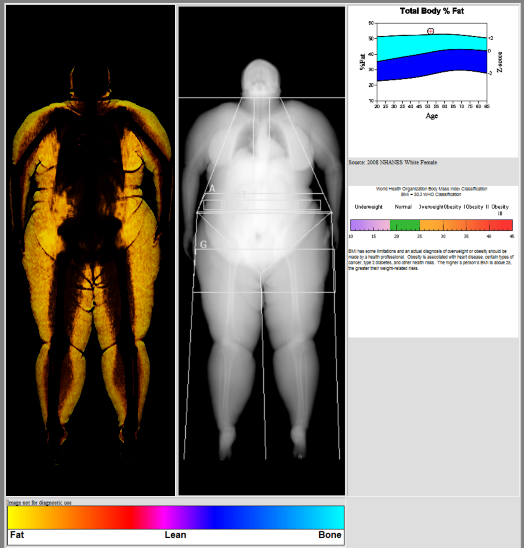
DXA Fat shadow of an obese individual

DXA scans can be used to measure total body composition and fat content with a high degree of accuracy comparable to hydrostatic weighing. The method involves firstly excluding pixels containing bone, and then in the remaining pixels assumes a mixture of fat and lean soft tissue and calculates the relative fractions of both (see Physics section for details on how this is done).

Body composition measurements from DXA have been shown to correlate strongly with more precise measurements from MRI and CT. However, there are several limitiations to measuring body composition with DXA, including the dependence of lean soft tissue mass on hydration status, maximum patient size and weight limits of DXA scanners, the inability to measure pixels where soft tissue overlaps with bone (approximately 40% of pixels), and some published studies have reported that DXA exhibits biases in measuring fat mass changes.

From the DXA scans, a low resolution "fat shadow" image can also be generated, which gives an overall impression of fat distribution throughout the body.

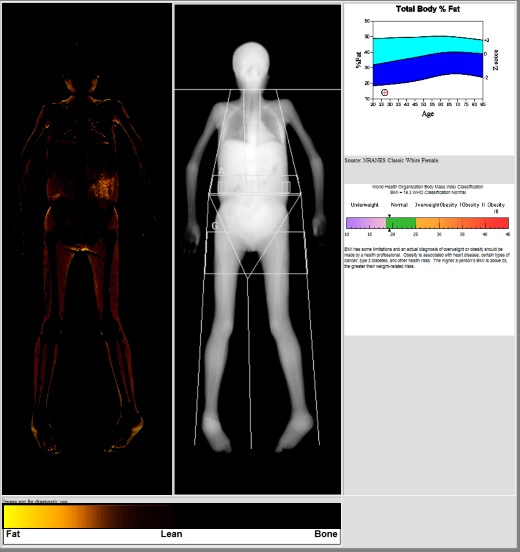
DXA fat shadow of a child with rare congenital generalized lipodystrophy

DXA scans have been suggested as useful tools to diagnose conditions with an abnormal fat distribution, such as familial partial lipodystrophy. They are also used to assess adiposity in children, especially to conduct clinical research. DXA scans are also used in clinical trials of weight loss drugs such as GLP-1 receptor agonists to assess the effects on body composition and musculoskeletal health.

== Radiation exposure ==
DXA uses X-rays to measure bone mineral density. The radiation dose of DEXA systems is small, as low as 0.001 mSv, much less than a standard chest or dental x-ray. However, the dose delivered by older DEXA radiation sources (that used radioisotopes rather than x-ray generators) could be as high as 35 mGy For comparison, the IAEA recommend that whole body effective dose for nuclear energy workers is 20 mSv/year (when averaged over 5 years) and does not exceed 50 mSv in a given year.

== Regulation ==
=== United States ===
Each US state differs regarding the certifications needed to operate a DXA machine. California, for example, requires a specific X-ray bone densitometry supervisor and operator permit, whereas Maryland has no requirements for DXA technicians.

=== Australia ===
In Australia, regulations differ according to the state or territory; for example the clinical densiometry course offered by the Australian and New Zealand Bone and Mineral Society is accepted by all Australian states apart from South Australia, which requires applicants to sit a separate examination run by the South Australian EPA.
