= FRAX =

- Purpose: ascertain bone fracture risk

FRAX (fracture risk assessment tool) is a diagnostic tool used to evaluate the 10-year probability of bone fracture risk. It was developed by the University of Sheffield. FRAX integrates clinical risk factors and bone mineral density at the femoral neck to calculate the 10-year probability of hip fracture and the 10-year probability of a major osteoporotic fracture (clinical spine, forearm, hip or shoulder fracture). The models used to develop the FRAX diagnostic tool were derived from studying patient populations in North America, Europe, Latin America, Asia and Australia.

== Components ==
The parameters included in a FRAX assessment, many being yes/no questions, are:

- Country
- Age
- Sex
- Weight
- Height
- Previous fracture
- Hip fracture of a patient's parent
- Current smoking
- Glucocorticoid treatment
- Rheumatoid arthritis
- Disease strongly associated with osteoporosis, including type I diabetes, osteogenesis imperfecta in adults, untreated long-standing hyperthyroidism, hypogonadism, menopause before age 45, chronic malnutrition or malabsorption, chronic renal failure (dialysis-independent) and chronic liver disease
- Alcohol intake of 30 ml per day or more (three standard drinks)
- Bone mineral density (BMD) of the femoral neck if known
- Trabecular bone score (optional)

== Availability and usage ==
FRAX is available free of charge online, and commercially as a desktop application, in paper-form as a FRAX pad, and as a mobile phone (Apple iOS or Android) application. The tool is compatible with 58 models for 53 countries, and is available in 28 languages.

FRAX is incorporated into many national guidelines around the world, including those of Belgium, Canada, Japan, Netherlands, Poland, Sweden, Switzerland, UK (NOGG), and US (NOF). FRAX assessments are intended to provide guidance for determining access to treatment in healthcare systems.

=== Adjustments ===
Glucocorticoid use is included FRAX as a dichotomous variable, whereas the increased risk for fractures seen with glucocorticoid use is dependent on glucocorticoid dose and duration of use. Several methods have been proposed how to adjust FRAX accordingly.

Though known to be a risk factor for fractures, type 2 diabetes is not included as such in FRAX. Some clinicians choose rheumatoid arthritis as an equivalent risk factor instead.

FRAX was developed and most commonly used to assess fracture risk for previously untreated individuals, though some have suggested it can also be used in those treated in the past or even on current treatment for osteoporosis.

== See also ==
- Preventive healthcare
