= Strike (attack) =

Directed physical attack

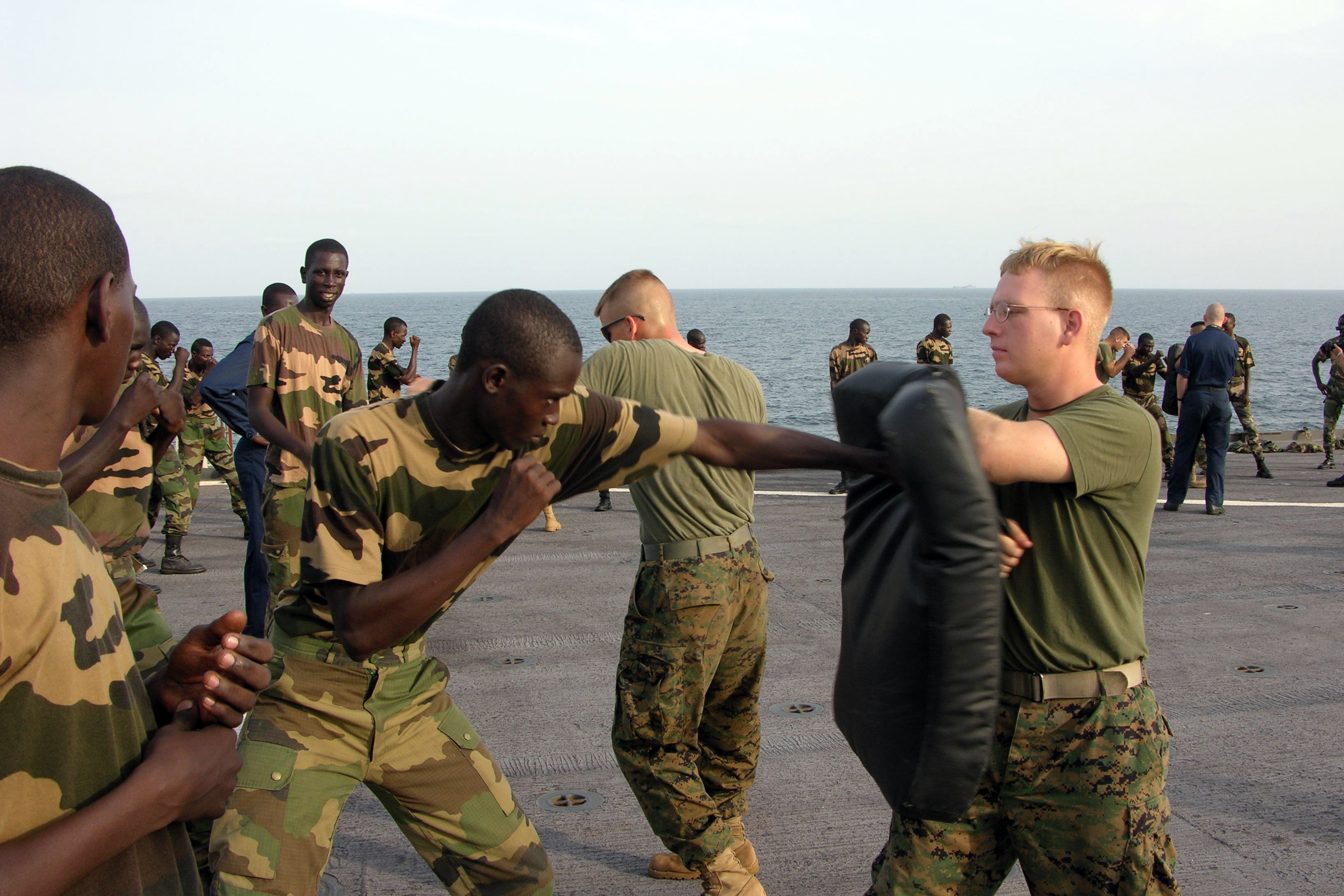
Senegalese Naval Infantry and US Marines practice striking

A strike is a directed, forceful physical attack, with either a part of the human body or a handheld object, intended to cause blunt or penetrating trauma to an opponent.

There are many varieties of strikes. A strike with the hand closed into a fist is known as a punch, a strike with a fingertip is known as a jab, a strike with the leg or foot is known as a kick, and a strike with the head is known as a headbutt. There are also other variations employed in martial arts and combat sports.

"Buffet" or "beat" refer to repeatedly and violently striking an opponent; this is also commonly referred to as a combination, or combo, especially in boxing or fighting video games.

== Usage ==
Strikes are the key focus of several sports and arts, including boxing, savate, karate, Muay Lao, taekwondo and wing chun. Some martial arts also use the fingertips, wrists, forearms, shoulders, back and hips to strike an opponent as well as the more conventional fists, palms, elbows, knees and feet that are common in combat sports. Other sports and arts, such as wrestling employ no strikes in focusing on grappling techniques. There is also a form of karate called goju ryu which focuses on pressure points (joints) in the legs and arms.

== Hands and arms ==
Arm strikes is the act of striking with some part of the palm, knuckle, arm, elbow, or shoulder. This is usually the elbow, the hand, the forearm, or the back of the wrist.

=== Open-hand ===
==== Palm ====
A strike using the palm of the hand. Whether the hand is open or the fingertips are folded against the bottom knuckles, palm strikes hit with the bottom part of the palm, where the hand meets the wrist. The hand is held perpendicular to the wrist to avoid hitting the softer inner wrist tissue against the target.

The bottom ridge of the palm is a surprisingly solid striking surface, and can do just as much damage as a closed fist when utilized properly (some studies have shown that a palm strike actually can produce more energy than a punch), with far less risk of injury to the striker's own hand.

The palm strike is useful as it is thrown in a more relaxed manner than a clenched fist. This is because clenching the fist shortens the extensor muscles of the wrist which counter the action of flexor muscles of the wrist used in punching. Many martial arts teach to keep the fist clench relaxed until impact in order to maximize the speed of the punch.

Targets are numerous and some examples include the nose, jaw, ears, back of the head, the groin, the kidneys, the temples and abdominal cavity. Some combat sports, such as Pancrase, have forbidden strikes using the clenched fist but permitted strikes using the palm.

==== Knife hand ====
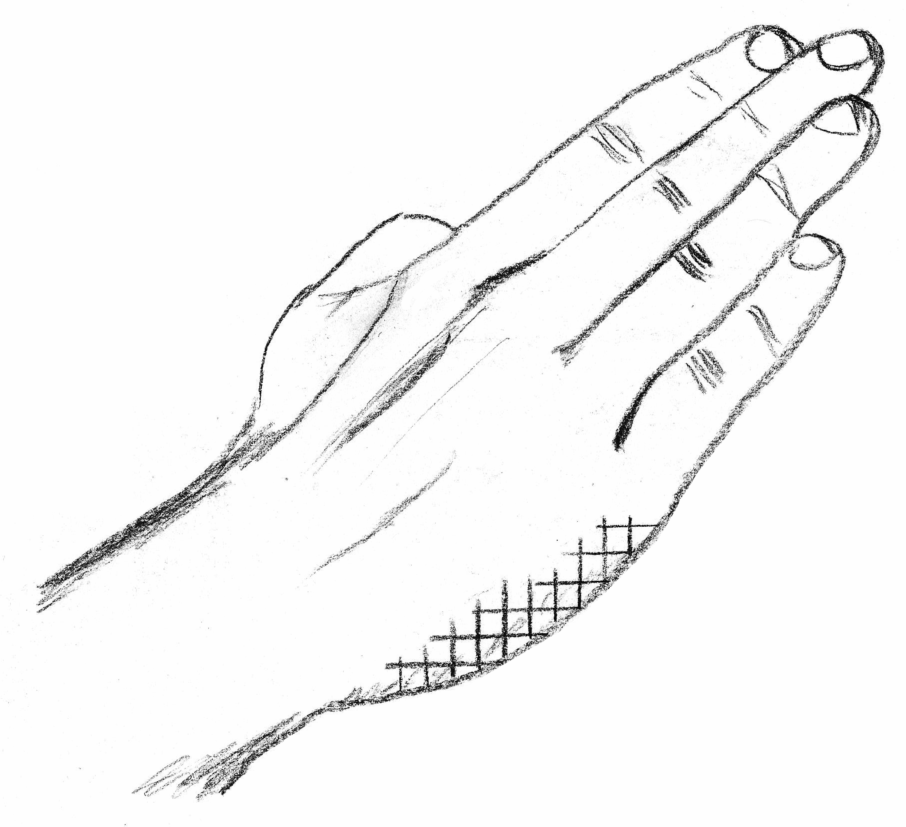
Knife hand

A strike using the part of the hand opposite the thumb (from the little finger to the wrist), familiar to many people as a karate chop, Shuto or Tegatana. This refers to strikes performed with the side of the knuckle of the small finger.

Suitable targets for the knife hand strike include the mastoid muscles of the neck, the jugular, the throat, the collar bones, the 3rd vertebra (key stone of the spinal column), the upper arm, the wrist (knife hand block), the elbow (outside knife hand block), and the knee cap (leg throw). In many Japanese and Chinese martial arts systems, the knife hand is used to block as well as to strike.

==== Ridge hand ====
Ridge hand

By tucking the thumb into the palm, a striking surface called the ridge-hand, or reverse knife-hand is formed, extending a few inches along the inside of the hand below the first knuckle of the first finger. Ridge-hand strikes commonly are delivered with a hooking motion, or with a straight arm swinging sideways.

Suitable targets include the mastoid muscles of the neck, the jugular, throat, nose, jaw, the eyes, and the groin. The ridge hand is generally considered obsolete in the martial arts and highly circumstantial. The conditioning required to effectively use it is usually better suited towards basic conditioning of other more natural parts of the body, such as punching or kicking. For example, the buckling that can occur on an unconditioned and sometimes even highly conditioned fighter when using the technique and slightly missing the main targets (eyes, neck, or nose) can do more damage to the striker, even when he hits decent targets instead, like the jaw or forehead. As such, it is considered a high-level and highly-circumstantial technique in the martial arts that still teach the technique, such as most forms of karate, tae kwon do, jujitsu, and kung fu. The ridge hand technique is very swift and when mastered can be a formidable technique, it was used successfully by Ian Fergusson (currently 7th degree Tae Kwon Do Master) in the 1981 Tae Kwon Do championships in Argentina earning him an individual bronze medal and contributed to the team international gold medal.

==== Spear hand ====
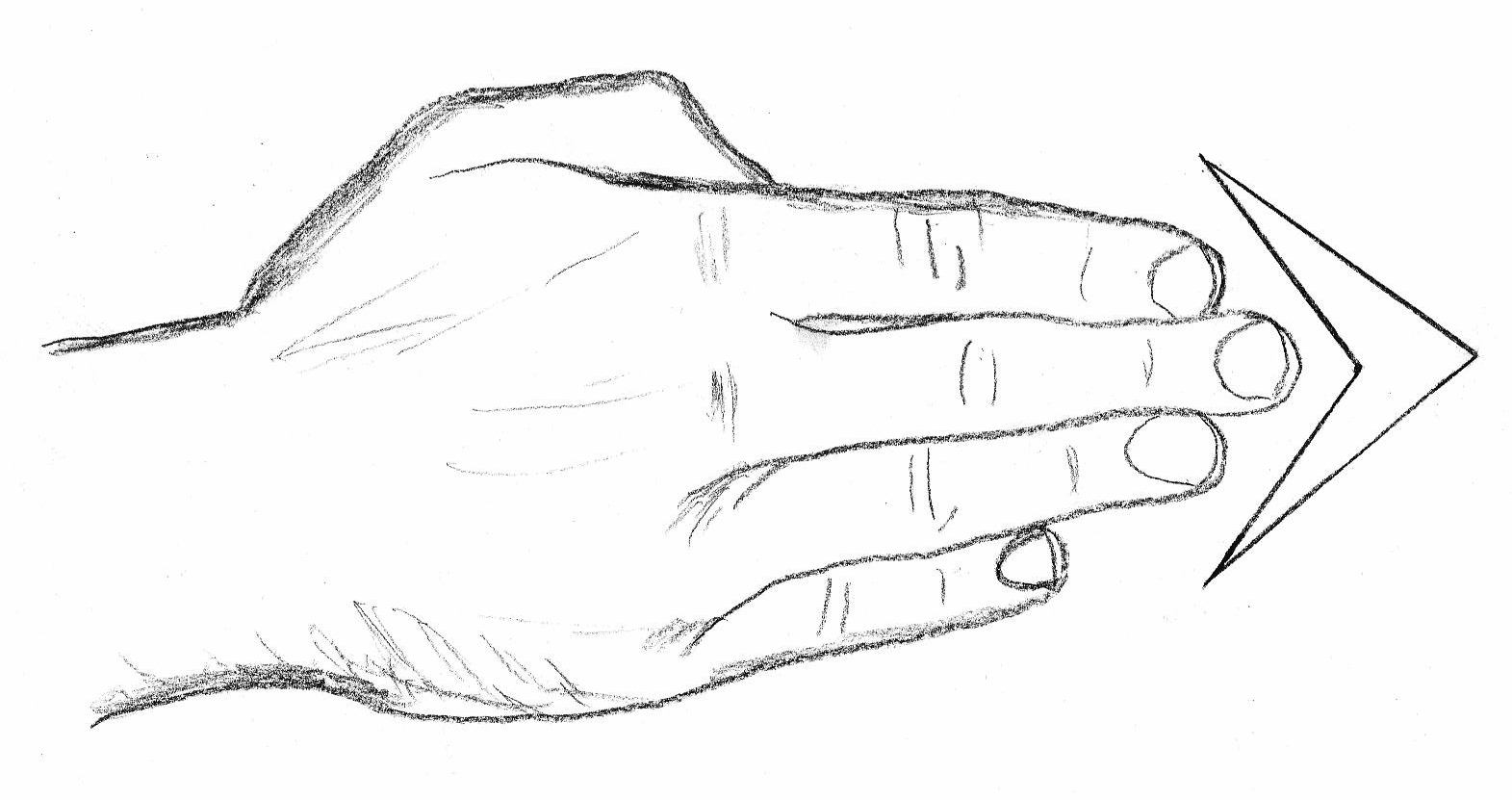
Spear hand

Delivered just as with a punch except that the hand is held open like with a knife hand. The intended striking area are the tips of the fingers. The ideal targets are the eyes and throat. This technique is generally unsuitable against most other targets due to the high probability of it breaking one's fingers. It does have the added advantage of increasing the range of normal hand striking by 3–4 inches or so as opposed to punching, backfisting, or hammer fisting. It is considered a high-level technique requiring enormous conditioning, but even accidental spear fingering can be quite devastating on the eyes such as punching mistakes seen in modern MMA circuits.

=== Closed-fist ===
==== Punch ====
A strike utilizing the hand with the fingers closed into a fist and striking with the knuckles (as opposed to the hammer fist described below). There are various methods of punches, including but not limited to the straight lead, the backfist, the jab, and the vertical punch.

==== Hammerfist ====
The hammerfist is a strike with the bottom of a clenched fist, using an action like swinging a hammer, but can also be used horizontally like a backfist strike using the bottom fist.

This strike will not damage the bones of the hands as there is no compression of the knuckles or metacarpals, and there is no leverage to bend the wrist.

The hammerfist strikes cricket ball sized areas on the body, hence is particularly effective for striking the occiput, the temples, the nose, the mandible, the wrist (for blocking punches), the testicles, the sternum, and the ear (although a cupped hand is more effective). The hammerfist is sometimes used during "ground-and-pound" striking in mixed martial arts to avoid damaging the bones of the hand.

The hammerfist can also be used to counter grappling charges wherein the assailant goes low, grabs the defender's legs, and gives the defender a concussion to the back of the head. It is a non-lethal alternative to performing a karate-chop on the assailant's exposed neck.

==== Extended knuckle ====
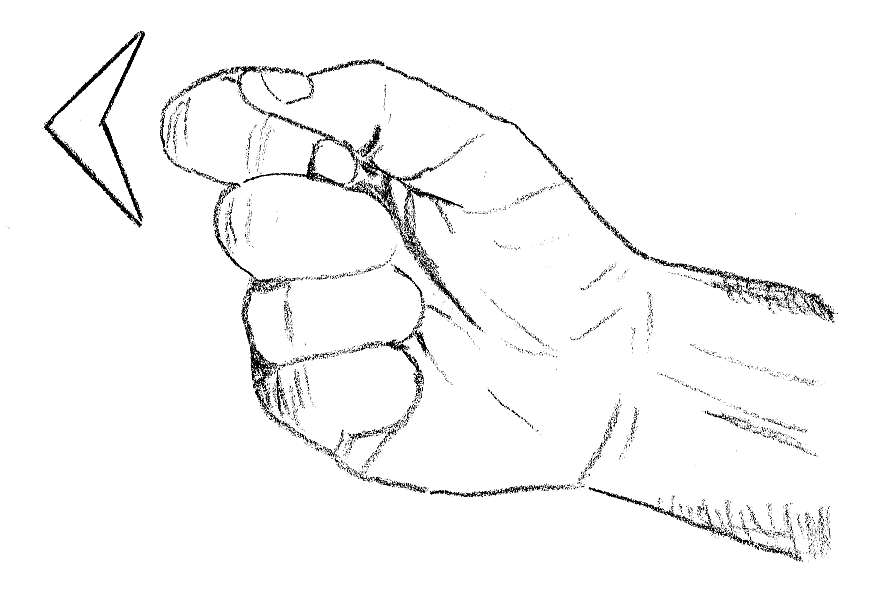
Extended knuckle (Ippon ken)

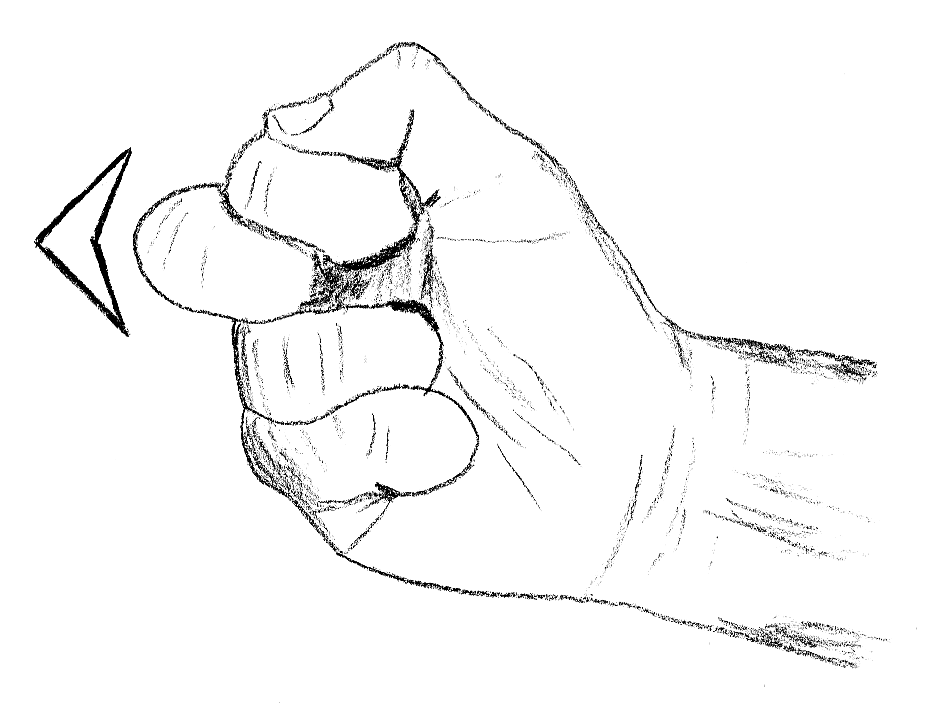
Extended knuckle (Nakadaka ken)

Hand strikes can be delivered with an extended knuckle, rather than the classic fist configuration used for a traditional punch. One of the fingers is moved forwards so that the impact is made with the knuckle, concentrating force onto a smaller area. This kind of strike is optimized for attacks to pressure points. Deriving from traditional and ancient Kung Fu, such striking was considered high level technique for advanced students/inheritors of the art. The accuracy required alongside the conditioning requirements (similar to the knuckles for traditional punching) put it as a circumstantial technique and not as a standard one.

Some modern martial arts, such as Krav Maga, Aikido, Hapkido, deliver this strike to the back of the hand while being held. It puts pressure on the small bones of the opponent's hand, causing its grip to loosen. This lets the practitioner transition smoothly into a small joint manipulation technique. However, its effectiveness when the opponent is aware that a fight is occurring has been disputed, with evidence hard to obtain due to the nature of the art and its disuse in sport, combat, sparring, or matches.

=== Elbow ===
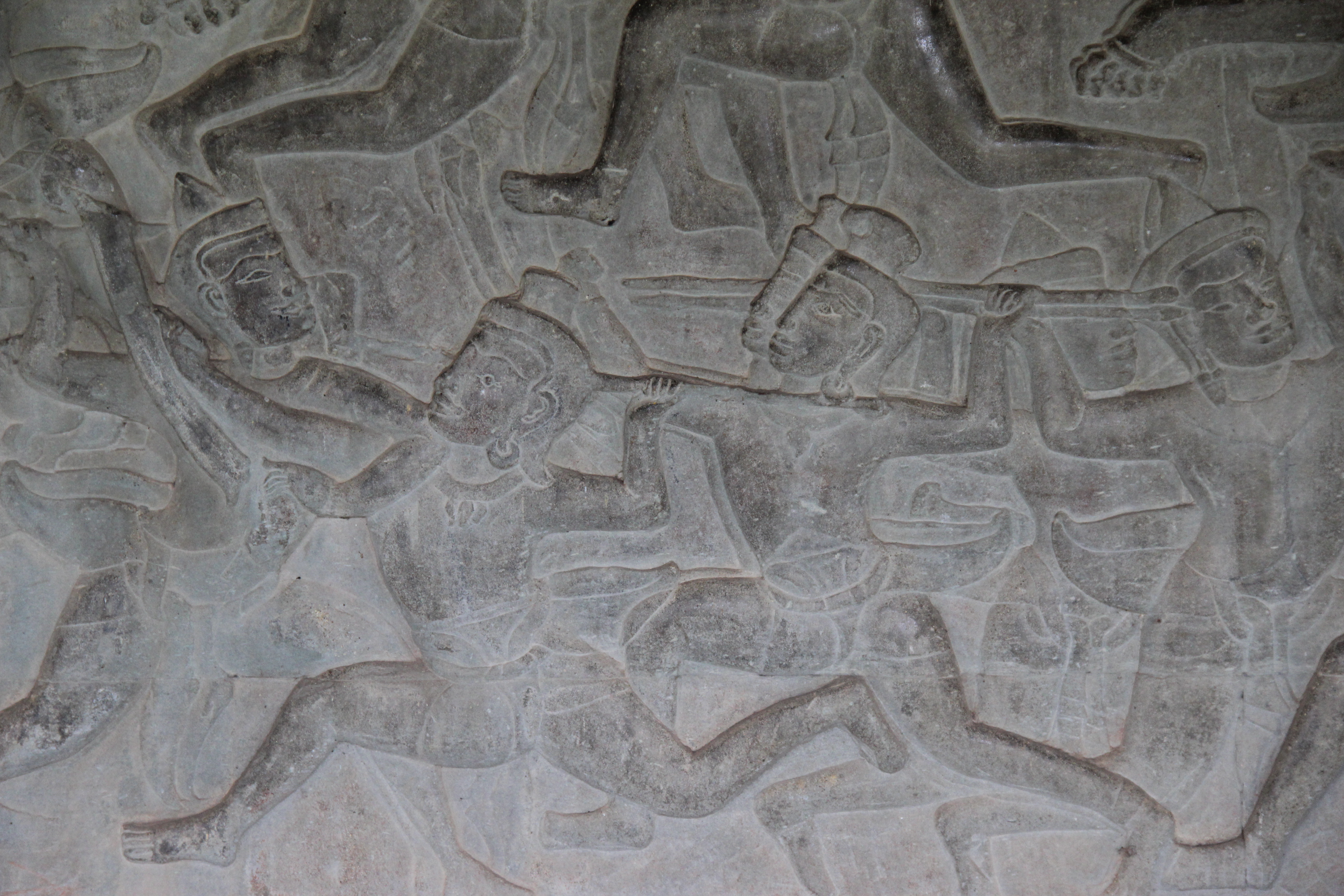
Bas-relief of an elbow strike to the jaw at Angkor Wat (12th century) in Cambodia

An elbow strike is any type of attack utilizing the adjoining bones of the humerus and the forearm. They can either be linear or circular, and can be used in similar fashion to a standard hook, uppercut, or overhand. Elbow and knee strikes, especially when delivered from a clinch are generally associated with southeast Asian boxing (Pradal Serey and Muay Lao).

=== Shoulder ===
A shoulder strike(also referred to as a shoulder butt) is a strike with the anterior part of the shoulder. It is commonly used in Bajiquan, the “Eight Extremities Fist”, as an explosive attack from the ‘zhen jiao’ (charging step) motion. This move is also commonly featured in many Japanese manga and fighting games, as the martial art is known in Japanese as Hakyyokuken. The shoulder strike can be used against the head of the opponent in close positions such as in a clinch or ground fighting, but is generally not considered to have knockout power. However, as used as a fulcrum for a joint hyperextension, such as an arm lock in classic jujitsu from stand-up or ground positions, can serve well to break said joint either when being the surface that an elbow is slammed upon or as a surface to balance out the break much as the thigh is for the juji-gatame in judo.

== Feet and legs ==
Leg strikes are a physical strike using the ball of the foot, heel, shin, knee or thigh (the latter is also known as a knee strike). This attack is often used in hand-to-hand combat, especially in stand-up fighting.

=== Kick ===
Kicks play a significant role in many forms of martial arts, such as Taekwondo, Karate, Kung fu, Vovinam, Kickboxing, Muay Thai, Capoeira, Silat, and Kalarippayattu.

==== Front kick ====
Delivering a front kick involves raising the knee and foot of the striking leg to the desired height, also known as chambering, and extending the leg to contact the target, typically with the upper body straight and balanced. The actual strike is usually delivered by the ball of the foot. Thrusting one's hips is a common method of increasing both reach and power of the kick; depending on practitioner's particular needs, a front kick may involve more or less body motion. Front kicks are typically aimed at targets below the chest: abdomen, thighs, groin, knees or lower, however advanced practitioner have the capability of striking head-level targets with the front kick.

==== Side kick ====
The side kick refers to a kick that is delivered sideways in relation to the body of the practitioner. There are two areas that are commonly used as impact points in sidekicks: the heel of the foot and the outer edge of the foot. The heel is more suited to hard targets such as the ribs, stomach, jaw, temple and chest. A sidekick is performed by first chambering the kicking leg diagonally across the body, then extending the leg in a linear fashion toward the target, while flexing the abdominals.

==== Roundhouse kick ====
Also referred to as a round kick, or turning kick, this is the most commonly used kick in combat sports due to its power and ease of use. In most traditional martial arts, the instep is used to strike, whereas in Muay Thai, kickboxing and mixed martial arts the shin is used. To execute, the attacker swings their leg sideways in a circular motion, kicking the opponent's side with the front of the leg, usually with the instep, ball of the foot, toe, or shin. An important variation is the downward roundhouse kick, nicknamed the Brazilian Kick from recent MMA use: A more pronounced twist of the hips allows for a downward end of the trajectory of the kick that is very deceiving.

=== Knee ===
A knee strike (commonly referred to simply as a knee) is a strike with the knee, either with the kneecap or the surrounding area. The most common is the straight knee strike, often employed from a clinch or double collar tie, targeting anywhere from the groin to the head. Variants include the curved knee strike, which is similar to a roundhouse kick, and the jumping or flying knee.

== Others ==
While less common, other parts of the body are used in specific strikes.

=== Bottom ===
In a bottom strike, as taught by Impact self-defense and other self-defense systems, the defendant drives his or her hips and bottom region backward into an attacker holding them from behind in order to cause the attacker to off-balance and bend forward and possibly cause pain by striking the groin or midsection forcefully. While causing minimal striking damage on average, the attack can serve to develop a superior and/or freed position for the defendant.

=== Headbutt ===
A headbutt is a strike with the head, typically involving the use of robust parts of the cranium as areas of impact. Effective headbutting revolves around striking a sensitive area with a less sensitive area, such as striking the nose of an opponent with the forehead. It is known as a risky maneuver: a misplaced headbutt can cause more damage to the person delivering the headbutt than to the person receiving it.

=== Hip and shoulder check ===
Checking involves striking with the side of the body, at the hip or shoulder, by shifting your balance and pushing with the furthest foot to drive the body into the opponent with force. While these movements are used extensively in ice hockey (see checking (ice hockey)) they can be performed equally well on dry ground and are part of various self-defense techniques. These strikes rarely cause damage, but are used to off-balance or knock an opponent down. However, when applied with ample power and to a vulnerable region they can cause pain, for example, hitting an opponent with the shoulder to the nose, striking the upper Quadriceps femoris muscle with the hip, or driving the shoulder into the opponent's solar plexus region.

The use of shoulders can also involve charging at the opponent at running speed, similar to a ram or tackle, though a short charge is possible where the attacker simple lunges straight at their opponent with their shoulder. These moves are generally unrefined and unprofessional, since they have a big tendency to miss, rely on brute force more than anything and usually require a run-up. If the charger does hit its intended target however, it can cause both pain and recoil to the target, knocking them over with the striker's kinetic energy being transferred to them and falling over as a result of the force or pain.

== Principles ==
Strikes in Asian martial arts and Western boxing have many of the same principles in common. These principles apply to strikes with most parts of the human body. These principles are typically learned by martial artists through multiple repetitions under the supervision of a qualified instructor. Many martial arts and texts include these principles, such as karate and Jeet Kune Do. This is only a partial list.

1. Timing of muscular tension: The striker relaxes to the extent possible while delivering a strike, tensing the muscles of much of the body only at the time of impact, then relaxing again to recoil the striking part. Relaxation enables the strike to achieve the greatest possible velocity during travel, while rigidity at impact allows the maximum transfer of energy. This also works when receiving a strike: initially being relaxed as in the case of delivering a strike, tensing the muscles when receiving the impact of the received strike and then relaxing again after the recoil of the received strike (such as with the abdomen during a body blow).
2. Breath control: Practitioners may include a kiai or shout, to help tense the muscles at impact and distract or frighten the opponent. Strikers generally exhale as the strike (either delivered or received) nears the target, in time with the tensing of their muscles. Breath control is also important to relax the body when not attacking; novice strikers often waste significant energy because they are tense at inappropriate times.
3. Penetration: Delivered strikes should aim for a point 4–6 inches (10–15 cm) behind the target surface, to impart the most energy into the target. The striker in combat should attempt to strike through the target area, not just contact the surface. An example of increasing penetration is in turning the fist as it is thrown, a very natural punching technique that the amount of turn depends on the position be it either as an attack, defense, or counter. Instinctive punching, boxing, along with most martial arts uses this type of punching aside from Wing Chun and Capoeira who favor adding slightly more speed at the cost of moderate power loss. Received strikes, conversely, are defended against by limiting their penetration (as shown by the preceding principles).
4. Focus: Strikes should channel force through a small area of the attacker's body. For example, this is the knuckles of the middle finger and index finger, the ridge of the hand, the base of the palm, and the edge of the elbow during karate arm strikes, or the crescent/blade, heel and ball of the foot and point and the edge of the knee in Tae Kwon Do leg strikes. Focus helps in achieving proper penetration and in maximizing the damage at the point of impact.
5. Kinetic linkage/Summation of force: Muscles are activated in a precise sequence to maximize the force generated. Strikes should generally be thrown with some measure of shifting body weight supporting the blow, as opposed to just the striking arm or leg. For example, the traditional boxing jab is made more forceful by driving off the rear leg and shifting body weight into the blow, while twisting the trunk and shoulder to further enhance the striking force.
6. Footwork: Proper footwork is used to enable the proper balancing of the body, to support combinations of strikes and launch strikes from the proper angle or distance. This is among the most complex elements of striking, as power ultimately flows from the legs in striking and optimizing the ability to throw combinations involves precise footwork.
7. Gravity: Strikes that go from high to low like hammerfists, downwards elbows, and stomp kicks see their force enhanced by gravity.

== Strategies ==
Besides applying the mechanical elements described above, strikers use particular strategies to help ensure their strikes are effective. Among these strategies are:

1. Combinations: Strikers may combine techniques in a series to ensure one or more strikes impact their opponents. These attacks are thrown at various targets on the body, with the greatest force typically thrown with a particular technique in the sequence.
2. Weak points: Strikers often target the vulnerable and sensitive areas of opponents to incapacitate opponents via damage of vital areas or pain (either lethally or less-lethally/non-lethally), such as the base of the head, neck, groin/crotch, spine, joints, solar plexus, creases of elbows and knees, midpoints of extremities (metacarpals (front and back of palm) of hand, forearm, bicep/tricep, thigh, calf, metatarsals (sole and instep) of foot), etc.
3. Level of attack: The height of attack is often varied, such as a jab to the head followed by a kick to the ribs. By varying the level of attack, strikers open the guard of their opponent.
4. Timing and rhythm: Experienced strikers learn through repetition and muscle memory when (not just how) to launch particular strikes, based on the circumstances they are facing. Fights and fighters may have ebbs and flows in momentum and action that become predictable. Disrupting this flow may give the striker an advantage.
5. Direct line: "Telegraphing" refers to moving the striking body part prior to actually launching the blow. Telegraphing signals the intent to the opponent and increases the likelihood the strike will not be effective. In general, the striking weapon should move first, with the body driving behind it. This requires proper distancing and footwork.
6. Deception: Strikers use feints or distractions to disguise the timing or direction of their attacks. Stomping the foot, noise, frequent hand movement, head movement, switching the guard position, etc. are common feints. Using feints, then attacking at multiple levels and with various techniques may help deceive the opponent, defeating their guard.
7. Dominant angle of attack: Achieving a positional advantage relative to your opponent. UFC champion Anderson Silva wrote: "The ultimate goal in fighting is to utilize footwork to acquire a dominant angle of attack." He defines this as "...a position from which you can strike your opponent, and your opponent is out of position to hit you with a strike...you want your hips facing your opponent and your opponents hips facing away from yours."

== Risks ==
The human hand and foot are made up of many small bones which may be damaged by heavy impact. If a hard part of the opponent's body or other hard object is inadvertently struck, the carpals, metacarpals, tarsals, metatarsals and phalanges (the wrist, hand, ankle, foot and fingers/toes) may splay and deform on impact and fracture. Martial artists wear wrist and ankle tape and handwear and footwear or other wraps so as to hold the carpals, metacarpals, tarsals, metatarsals and phalanges together and keep them from splaying and deforming, both to avoid causing debilitating injuries to themselves as well as to ensure a more direct transmission of force in their strikes by stabilising their striking limbs while delivering the strikes. One can toughen one's bones by striking objects to induce osteoclasts (cells which remove bone) and osteoblasts (which form bone) to remodel the bone over the struck area increasing the density of bone at the striking surface. For more information on remodeling, see Wolff's law, Davis's law, and Mechanostat.

== See also ==
- Makiwara
- Poke
- Punching bag
- Atemi
- Varma kalai
