= Julius Wolff (surgeon) =

German surgeon (1836–1902)

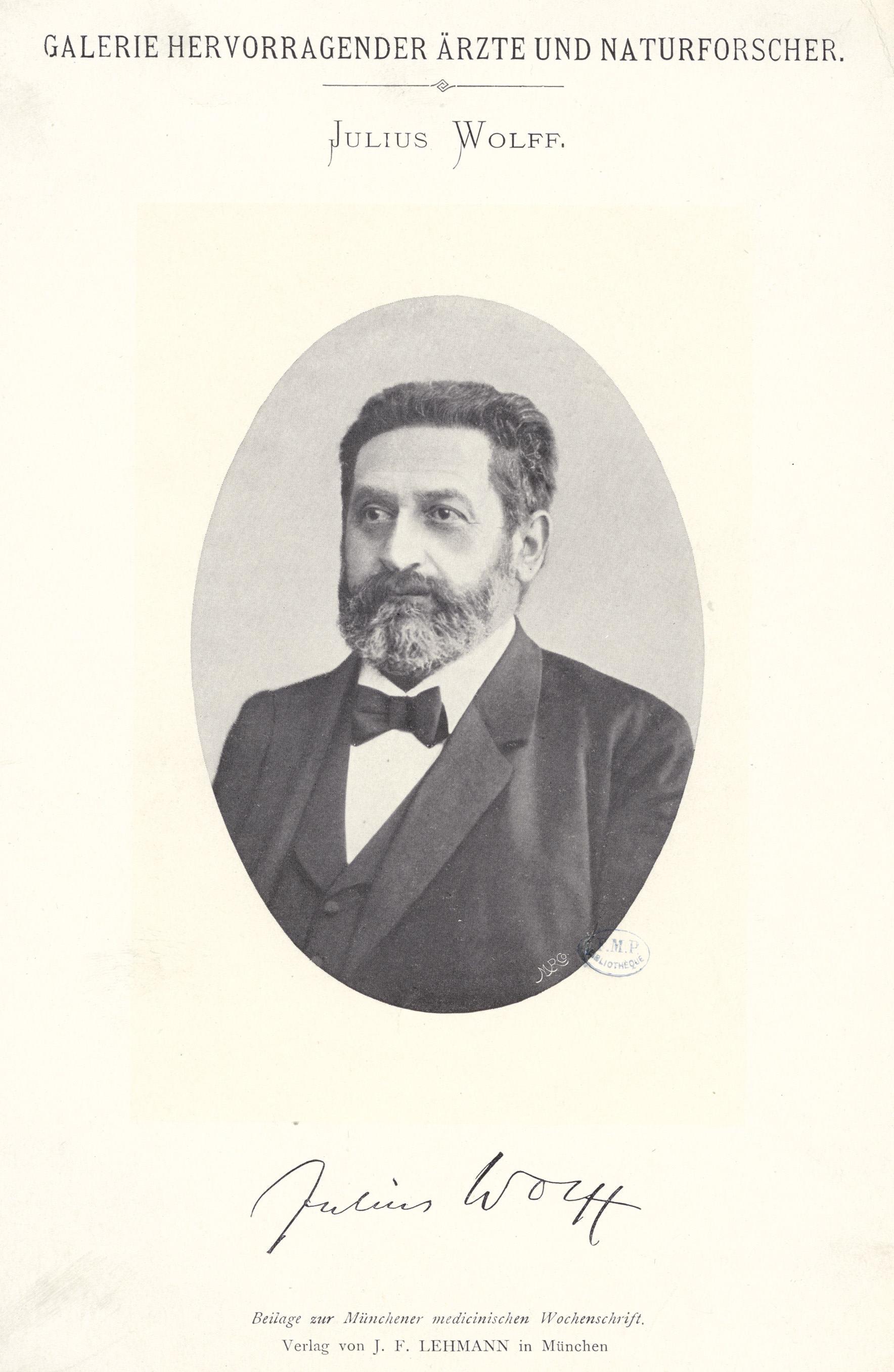
Julius Wolff

Julius Wolff (21 March 1836 – 18 February 1902) was a German surgeon.

== Biography ==
Julius Wolf was born on 21 March 1836 in Märkisch Friedland, and received his doctorate in 1861 in the field of surgery under Bernhard von Langenbeck (1810–1887) at Friedrich-Wilhelms University in Berlin. In 1861 he settled down after the state examination as a general practitioner in Berlin. He participated as a surgeon in three military campaigns (1864, 1866, 1870/71).

Based on observations in his long career as a surgeon, he postulated Wolff's law (original title 1892: The law of transformation of the bone), which describes the relationship between bone geometry and mechanical influences on bone. For this he was with leading scientists of his time in active contact. Karl Culmann (1821–1881), Wilhelm Roux (1850–1924), Christian Otto Mohr (1835–1918) and Albert Hoffa (1859–1907) gave him support for the interpretation and evaluation of its research. His work established the mechanism and thus physical factors in evolutionary biology. He saw his work as an extension of the theory of evolution by Charles Darwin (1809–1882).

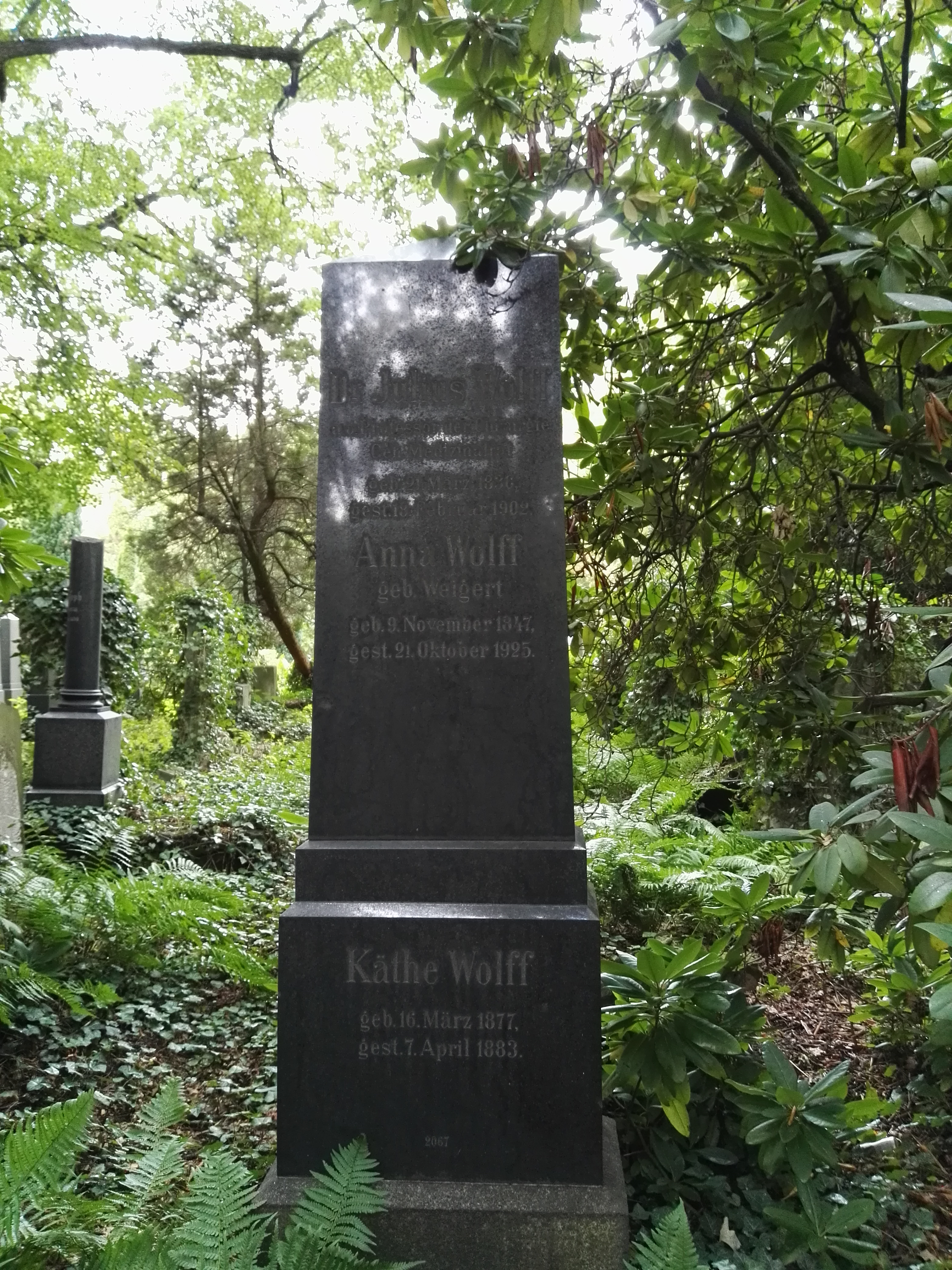
Grave of Julius Wolff at the Jüdischen Friedhof, Weissensee (Berlin).

His work was one of the mile stones for orthopedics as a distinct discipline in medicine. Julius Wolff was the first professor of orthopedics at the Charité and the founder and director of the first Department of Orthopaedic Surgery in Berlin. His scientific work has to this day a significant impact on orthopedic surgery. His findings that adapted bone altered mechanical conditions found today in application of musculoskeletal research, orthopedics, trauma surgery, rehabilitation, mechano-and cell biology and tissue engineering.

He died on 18 February 1902 of a stroke.

== Bibliography ==
1860 De artificiali ossium productione in animalibus, Diss. Kaiser Wilhelm Universität Berlin

1863 Die Osteoplastik in ihren Beziehungen zur Chirurgie und Physiologie. Archiv für Klinische Chirurgie 4: 183-296

1868 Ueber Knochenwachsthum. August Hirschwald, Berlin, Berliner klinische Wochenschrift 5(6): 62-64, 76-77, 110-112

1869 Ueber die Bedeutung der Architectur des spongiösen Substanz. Zentralblatt für die medizinischen Wissenschaft VI: 223-234

1870 Über die innere Architektur der Knochen und ihre Bedeutung für die Frage vom Knochenwachstum. Virchow’s Archiv 50(3): 389-453

1872 Beiträge zur Lehre von der Heilung der Fracturen. Archiv für klinische Chirurgie 14: 270-312, 389-453

1873 Zur Lehre der Fracturheilung. Deutsche Zeitschrift für Chirurgie 2(6) 546-551

1875 Ueber die Expansion des Knochengewebes. August Hirschwald, Berlin, Berliner klinische Wochenschrift 6, 8

1875 Einige Bemerkungen zum gegenwärtigen Stand der Knochenwachsthumsfrage. Virchow’s Archiv 64:140-144.

1877 Ueber den Gudden’schen Markirversuch am Kaninchenschädel. Verhandl. der Berliner physiologischen Gesellschaft. Deutsche mediz. Wochenschrift 24

1879 Zur Knochenwachsthumsfrage. August Hirschwald, Berlin, Berliner klinische Wochenschrift 48

1882 Strangförmige Degeneration der Hinterstränge des Rückenmarkes mit gleichzeitigen menigomyelitischen Herden

1883 Ueber trophische Störungen bei primären Gelenkleiden. August Hirschwald, Berlin, Berliner klinische Wochenschrift 28

1883 Ueber doppelseitig fortschreitende Gesichtsatrophie. Virchow’s Archiv 94(3):393-405

1884 Das Gesetz der Transformation der inneren Architektur der Knochen bei pathologischer Veränderung der äusseren Knochenform. Sitzungsbericht – Preussische Akademie der Wissenschaften 22 Physikalisch Mathematische Klasse, S 475-496

1884 Die Verkürzung ausgewachsener Röhrenknochen. August Hirschwald, Berlin, Berliner klinische Wochenschrift 25

1884 Zur neuesten, die Knochenwachsthumsfrage betreffenden Polemik. August Hirschwald, Berlin, Berliner klinische Wochenschrift 40

1885 Ueber die Ursachen und die Behandlung der Deformitäten, insbesondere des Klumpfusses. August Hirschwald, Berlin, Berliner klinische Wochenschrift 22: 161-166, 182-186

1885 Markierversuche am Scheitel- Stirn und Nasenbein der Kaninchen, Virchow’s Archiv 101(3): 572-630

1888 Ueber das Wachsthum des Unterkiefers. Virchow’s Archiv 114(3): 493-547

1888 Ueber das Wachsthum des Unterkiefers. Zweiter Beitrag zu den experimentellen Untersuchungen des Knochenwachstums. Virchow’s Archiv 114: 493-547

1889 Zur Klumpfussbehandlung mittels portativen Verbandes. August Hirschwald, Berlin, Berliner klinische Wochenschrift 8

1891 Ueber die Theorie des Knochenschwundes durch vermehrten Druck und der Knochenausbildung durch Druckentlastung. Archiv für klinische Chirurgie 42(2): 302-324

1891 Demonstration, betreffend die Deformitäten. Sitzungsbericht der Freien Vereinigung der Chirurgen Berlin’s. Deutsche medizinische Wochenschrift 19(16)

1892 Das Gesetz der Transformation der Knochen. August Hirschwald, Berlin

1896 Die Lehre von der functionellen Pathogenese der Deformitäten. Archiv für klinische Chirurgie 53: 831-905

1899 Die Lehre von der functionellen Knochengestalt. Virchow’s Archiv 155: 256-315.

1899 Entgegnung auf F. Baehr’s Bemerkungen im 2. Heft des vorigen Bandes. Virchow’s Archiv 157(1): 195-196

1901 Ueber die Wechselbeziehung zwischen der Form und der Function der einzelnen Gebilde des Organismus. Verh. Ges. Deutscher Naturforsch. Ärzte, Band 72: 82-114

1901 Über die normale und pathologische Architektur der Knochen, Virchow’s Archiv 163: 239–262.

--> Source Reprint "Das Gesetz der Transformation der Knochen, Pro Business, Berlin 2010

== Timeline ==
21 March 1836 Born in Märkisch-Friedland in West Prussia

from 1849 Grammar school „Zum Grauen Kloster“ in Berlin

1855- 1860 Medical Study at the Friedrich-Wilhelms-University Berlin

1860 Thesis by Bernhard Langenbeck - Title: „De Artificiali Ossium Productione in Animalibus“

1861 Establishment of a general practitioner in Berlin medical officer at the „Lebens Versicherungs Gesellschaft Germania“

1868 Professorship and appointment as private instructors with course work at the Friedrich-Wilhelms-Universität Berlin

1869 Wedding with Anna Weigert

1870 Publication „About the inner architecture of bone and its relevance to the issue of bone growth" (Über die innere Architektur der Knochen und ihre Bedeutung für die Frage des Knochenwachstums)

1882 Establishing the „Private hospital for surgical diseases“

1884 Appointment as associate professor of Faculty of Medicine at the Friedrich-Wilhelms-University to Berlin

from 1886 Board Member of the Free Association of Surgeons of Berlin

1890 Establishment a part of the private hospital as a "Provisional Department of Orthopaedic Surgery at the Friedrich-Wilhelms-University, (no financial support) and appointed as its director

1892 Publication of his magnum opus "The law of transformation of the bone"

1894 Transfer of the temporary clinic in 'Department of Orthopedic Surgery with University Budget

1899 Appointment as Privy Medical Officer (Geheimer Medizinalrat) of Health at the Medical Faculty of the Friedrich-Wilhelms-University

1901 Co-founder of the German Society for Orthopedic Surgery "

1901 Acquisition of the clinic in the Charité group as a "Royal University Polyclinic"

18 February 1902 Death from stroke

== See also ==
- The Classic: On the Inner Architecture of Bones and its Importance for Bone Growth, Clin Orthop Rel Res. 2010 Apr;468(4):1056-1065

https://doi.org/10.1007%2Fs11999-010-1239-2

- The Classic: On the Theory of Fracture Healing, Clin Orthop Rel Res. 2010 Apr;468(4):1052-1055

https://doi.org/10.1007%2Fs11999-010-1240-9

- Mechanostat, similar law developed by Harold Frost
