= Gasset =

Gasset or Gassett is a Spanish surname. Notable people with the surname include:

== Gasset ==
- Antonio Gasset (1946–2021), Spanish journalist, television host and film critic
- Eduardo Ortega y Gasset (1882–1964), Spanish lawyer and politician
- Jean-Louis Gasset (1953–2025), French footballer and manager
- José Ortega y Gasset (1885–1955), Spanish philosopher and essayist
- Rafael Gasset (1866–1927), Spanish lawyer, journalist, and politician

== Gassett ==
- Henry Gassett Davis (1807–1896), American orthopedic surgeon
