= Mechanography =

- Purpose: assessment of muscle function

Mechanography (also referred to as jumping mechanography or muscle mechanography) is a medical diagnostic measurement method for motion analysis and assessment of muscle function and muscle power by means of physical parameters. The method is based on measuring the variation of the ground reaction forces over the time for motion patterns close to typical every day movements (e.g. chair rise or jumps). From these ground reaction forces centre of gravity related physical parameters like relative maximum forces, velocity, power output, kinetic energy, potential energy, height of jump or whole body stiffness are calculated. If the ground reaction forces are measured separately for left and right leg in addition body imbalances during the motions can be analysed. This enables for example to document the results of therapy. The same methodology can also be used for gait analysis or for analysis of stair climbing, grip strength and posturography. Due to the utilization of every-day movements reproducibility is high over a wide age range.

== Fields of application ==
Typical fields of applications of Mechanography are in the field of geriatrics especially in the field of Sarcopenia but also for Master Athletes. Mechanography is also used frequently in pediatrics for basic research ins muscle function and growth, reference Data as well as in specific diseases like Prader–Willi syndrome, Obesity, Osteogenesis Imperfecta and cerebral palsy. In opposite to many other established measurements methods like Chair Rising Test, Stand-up and Go test and others the maximum power output relative to body weight during a jump of maximum height measured by Mechanography is a much better reproducible and does not have a training effect even when repeated more frequently.

Based on this test (maximum relative power output of a jump as high as possible) Runge et al. and Schönau et al. defined reference values of a fit population in order to match the individual power output in relation to bodyweight, age and gender Tsubaki showed when using identical selection criteria as Runge that the relative Power of the Japanese population is identical with western European population which delimits the need for localized reference data. Runge et al. also showed the interrelation between the measured individual power output and the neuromuscular caused fall risk.

Due to this objective and highly reproducible quantification of typical every day movements by means of physical parameters the Mechanography is well suited to document the physical state of a person as well as the effects of training or therapy. Because of this it is also one of the standard measurements in recent and current Bed Rest Studies of the European Space Agency (ESA). and the Mars500 Mission.

Mechanography has also been used to explore the relation between muscle and bone. According to the Mechanostat theorem muscle function influences bone growth. By combining functional measurement methods like Mechanography and quantitative computer tomographic measurements analysing bone density, geometry and strength this relationship can be assessed. In sports research Mechanography has been used to assess principle training effects.

== Mechanography Devices ==
The standard Mechanography measurement devices as used in all referenced articles are the Leonardo Mechanograph™ systems supplied by Novotec Medical GmbH, Pforzheim, Germany.
