= Single photon absorptiometry =

Technique to measure density of bones

Single Photon Absorptiometry
- Synonyms: no descirbtion
- Reference range: no descirbtion
- Purpose: measurement of bone mineral density
- Test of: bone mineral density
- Based on: Chemical method detection

Single photon absorptiometry is a measuring method for bone density invented by John R. Cameron and James A. Sorenson in 1963.

== History ==
Single photon absorptiometry (SPA) was developed in 1963 by Steichen et al. In 1976, it was an important tool for quantifying bone mineralization in infants. The single photon absorption method operates when a certain amount of gamma rays emitted by isotopes, pass through human tissues. There is an exponential function relationship between the number of gamma rays absorbed and the thickness of tissues, and the absorption characteristics of different tissues are different, but the effects of soft tissues and water on gamma rays are the same. Therefore, the influence of soft tissues can be eliminated by a water bath, and the number of gamma rays absorbed by bone tissues can be measured, and then calculated. The bone mineral content (BMC) was calculated. This method is mainly used for bone measurements of limbs and population census with the aid of the water bath.

== Principle of use ==
=== Operations ===
In 1963, the single photon absorption Assay (SPA) invented by Cameron and Sorenson was the first quantitative analysis method applied to the diagnosis of osteoporosis. This method uses the principle that the absorption of radioactive substances by bone tissue is proportional to the bone mineral content. Iodine or Americium gamma photons are used as a light source to penetrate the forearm. After being absorbed by the bone and soft tissue, NaI (Tl) crystal is used to detect the radioactivity counts parallel to the light source. BMC and BMD are obtained by calculating the density of photon energy emitted and emitted. The location of measurement is usually located at the 1/3 junction of the ulna and distal radius, or at the less soft tissue sites such as calcaneus and hand bone, wrapped in a water bag and placed between light source and detector. BMC (g/cm) can be obtained by synthesizing the measured bone gamma photon absorption energy. BMD (g/cm) can be obtained by dividing BMC by bone width. This method can only measure the bone mineral content of limbs. If the isotope source is changed to X-ray source, that is, single energy X-ray absorptiometer (SXA), the principle and determination method is the same as SPA, but the radiation source is different.

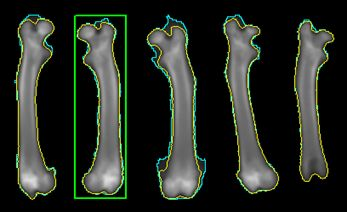
Bone density

The basic principle of single-photon bone mineral density measuring instrument is to calculate the attenuation degree of single-energy gamma photon beam through bone tissue. The more attenuation degree is, the more absorbed by bone minerals, the more bone mineral content and the higher bone mineral density are. This method is called gamma-ray absorption method, which is also called single-photon absorption method. This method is the most convenient for measuring radius and ulna, and the object of observation is left. The junction point of the middle and lower 1/3 of the radial and ulnar bones is the measuring point. The height and weight parameters of the observed objects are measured routinely before measurement.

=== Indicators or equipment needed in this method ===
Single photon absorption is the earliest method to measure bone mineral density accurately. Its basic principle is that bone mineral density can be obtained by the law of absorption. In this law, the important parameters to be obtained are bone thickness, bone absorption coefficient and radiation intensity (or counting) after bone absorption. The thickness of soft tissue measured by single photon absorption method is the same. Soft tissue does not affect the results of bone tissue measurement. Therefore, the absorption coefficient of a beam of constant energy radiation can be calculated beforehand, and the intensity of radiation (or counting) can be obtained directly in patients' measurement.

In the vertical C-frame, the collimated 125I light source (200 mCi or 74 GBq) and the collimated NaI (TI) scintillation detector-photomultiplier tube are mounted in relative geometric shapes to place the measured body parts between the source and the detector. The source and detector assembly are rigidly connected and driven by a motor to cross the longitudinal axis of the bone.

== History of use ==
=== History of using this method to measure bone density ===
An early attempt which used conventional X-rays to measure bone mineral density (BMD) uses stepped wedges made of aluminum or ivory phantom as a calibration tool. The bone mineral density was calculated by visually comparing the bone mineral density and the known density at each step of the phantom. The next improvement in the field of bone mineral density is the single-photon absorption (SPA) method invented by Cameron and Sorenson in 1963.

=== The improvements it has made ===
The expensive and potentially dangerous radioactive sources used in SPA and DPA have been replaced by single X-ray absorptiometry (SXA) and dual-energy X-ray absorptiometry (DXA) since the late 1980s. Similar to DPA, the basic principle of DXA is to measure the high and low energy X-ray transmission of stable X-ray sources. The shorter acquisition time, higher accuracy and resolution, and availability exposure can be considered as advantages of using X-rays instead of SPA or DPA. With the increasing popularity of DXA, its application in pediatric research and clinical practice has increased significantly.

At the same time, because SPA is only one energy photon, the actual measurement site is limited to limb bones, especially the distal limb bones, while there is a lot of fat and gas around the trunk bone tissue, so the single photon absorption method is "powerless". At present, the main improvement is to change the isotope source to X-ray source, which cannot only stabilise the voltage, but also improve the measurement accuracy, resolution and speed. As a result, it has also developed from one-dimensional scanning to two-dimensional scanning, from waveform representation of bone mineral density to matrix arrangement of bone mineral density, which more intuitively reflects bone mineral density.

== Current use in the medical field ==
=== Current application in the medical fields ===
In the past 10 years, measuring forearm bone mass by single photon absorptiometry measurement has become one of the most widely used methods for evaluating cortical bone. There are several different scanners with slight differences in measurement settings. Scanning sites range from mid-axis to distal end, and some scanners measure only one of the forearm bones. Our technique uses six scans over 2 cm in length to minimize repositioning errors and improve accuracy.

=== Advantages and disadvantages of this method ===
Bone thickness can be obtained by measuring the law of absorption. Bone thickness multiplied by the density of hydroxyapatite is bone density (g/cm^{2}). Single photon absorption is the most commonly used method to measure the distal and middle radius of the non-dominant upper extremity, or the distal radius of the radius of the distal 1/10, the ultra-distal radius and calcaneus, hand bone and so on. Because 95% of the cortical bone in the middle and distal radius is located in one third of the radius, and the change of the external diameter of the bone is very small on the longitudinal axis, the measurement accuracy is better. However, the disadvantage is that the measurement results mainly reflect the density of cortical bone and cannot reflect the change of cancellous bone density with faster metabolism, so it cannot be used as a monitoring method for the early change of bone metabolism.

== Evaluation of use ==
=== Evaluation ===
Single photon absorptiometry is the first quantitative analysis method used in the diagnosis of osteoporosis. To evaluate bone quality, bone mineral content (BMC) and bone mineral density (BMD) are important indicators, and bone quality can reflect the health status of normal human bone tissue to a certain extent. Bone loss is systemic, and there is no effective treatment to restore it to normal. Therefore, it is particularly important to adopt a safe, simple and sensitive method for early diagnosis and prevention of osteoporosis.

Generally speaking, the single photon absorption method is simple, portable, economical and practical, and the measuring time is relatively short (1% of the conventional X-ray). It is not affected by local osteosclerosis and proliferation. Therefore, it can be used as a means of large-area bone mineral density sieve, especially in rural areas and communities.

=== Possible impact on the human body ===
These 125I-based instruments (now known as single photon absorptiometry) have been widely used for many years, and their medical applications have been well established. SPA measurements have been proved that can identify elderly women who are particularly vulnerable to fractures by prospective follow-up studies in Sweden, Indiana, and Hawaii, as confirmed by multicenter trials in the United States, including a recent follow-up of 9,000 elderly women. The Swedish study showed that technology had the same predictive power (younger than other studies) for women aged 50–59. The predictive power extends to hip fractures and males. The US multicenter trial showed that SPA forearm measurements were as good as SPA heel or dual-energy X-ray absorptiometry (DEXA) spine or hip measurements and could be used to predict future overall fractures in elder women.

=== Comparison with other methods for measuring the bone mineral density ===
- Single photon absorptiometry (SPA)

According to the principle that the absorption of radioactive materials by bone tissue is proportional to the bone mineral content, the bone mineral content of the human limb bone was determined by using the radioisotope as the light source. The most common location is the intersection of the tibia and ulna (middle and lower forequarters 1-3) as a measurement point. The method is widely used in many countries, with simple equipment and low price, suitable for epidemiological investigations. However, this method cannot measure the bone density of the hip and the central axis (vertebral body).

- Dual-energy X-ray absorptiometry (DEXA)

Through the X-ray tube ball through a certain device to obtain two kinds of energy, that is, low energy and high energy photons. After the peak photons penetrate the human body, the bone mineral content will be obtained after the scanning system sent the received signal to the computer for data processing. Any part of the whole body can be measured by the instrument with high precision and little harm to the human body. The radiation dose at one site is equivalent to 1% of the chest X-ray dose and 1% of the QCT dose. There is no problem with the decay of radioactive sources, and many cities and hospitals have gradually carried out this work, and the prospects are bright.

- Quantitative computed tomography (QCT)

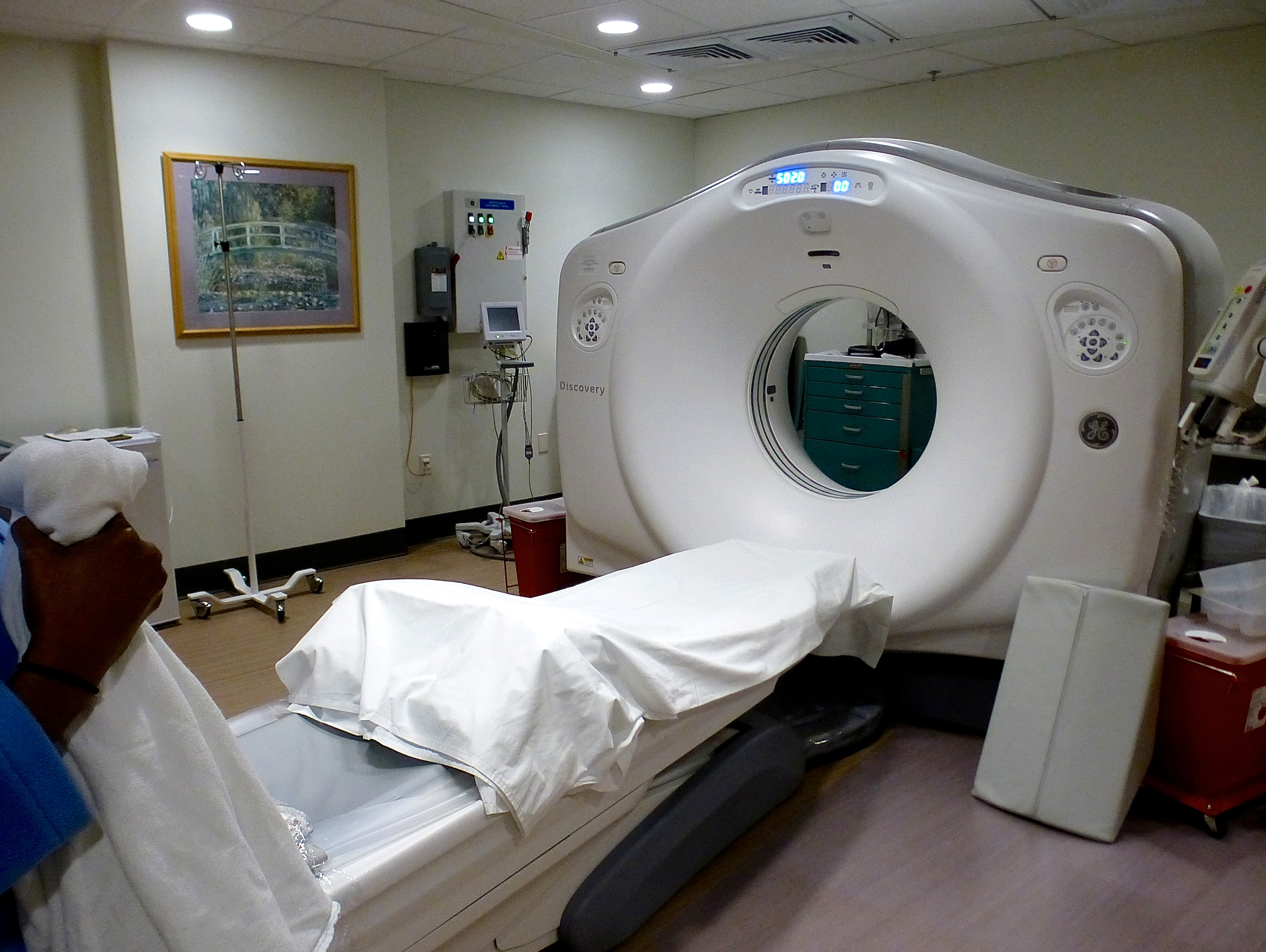
CT Scanner

In the past 20 years, Computer Layer (CT) has been widely used in the field of clinical radiology. QCT can accurately measure bone density at specific parts of the bone and the bone density of the cortical bone can also be measured. Clinically, osteoporotic fractures are usually located in the spongy area of the spine, femoral neck, and distal radius. QCT can be used to observe changes in bone mineral content at these sites because subjects receive a large number of X-rays and can only be used in research work.

- Ultrasonic measurement

Ultrasound measurements have received widespread attention due to their lack of radiation and sensitive diagnosis of fractures. The amount of bone mineral content, bone structure, and bone strength can be reflected better by velocity and amplitude attenuation and has a good correlation with DEXA. The method is easy to operate, safe and harmless, and low in price. The instrument used was an ultrasonic bone densitometer.
