= X-ray motion analysis =

Technique to track the movement of objects using X-rays

X-ray motion analysis is a technique used to track the movement of objects using X-rays. This is done by placing the subject to be imaged in the center of the X-ray beam and recording the motion using an image intensifier and a high-speed camera, allowing for high quality videos sampled many times per second. Depending on the settings of the X-rays, this technique can visualize specific structures in an object, such as bones or cartilage. X-ray motion analysis can be used to perform gait analysis, analyze joint movement, or record the motion of bones obscured by soft tissue. The ability to measure skeletal motions is a key aspect to one's understanding of vertebrate biomechanics, energetics, and motor control.

== Imaging methods ==
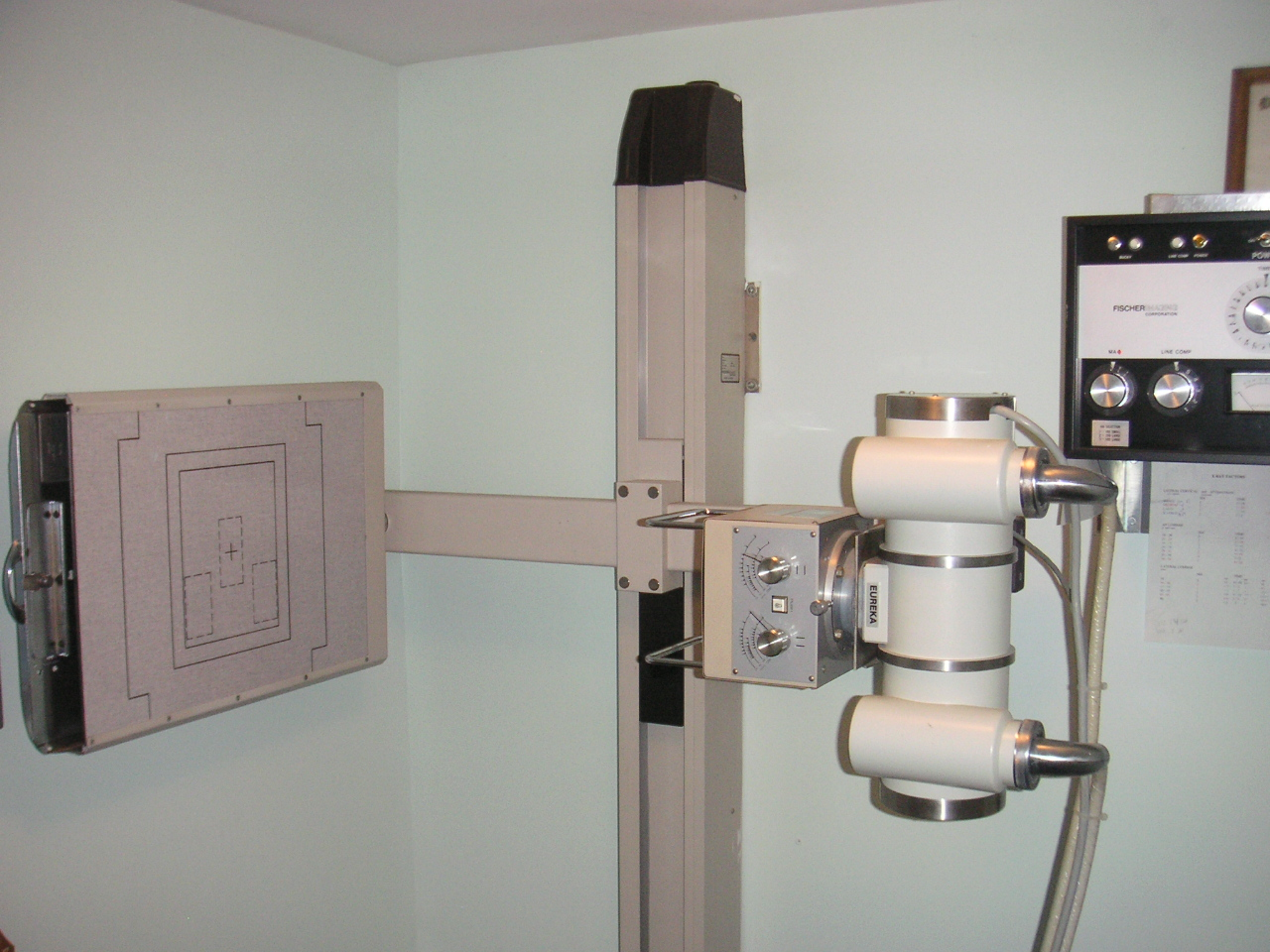
A planar X-ray system.

=== Planar ===
Many X-ray studies are performed with a single X-ray emitter and camera. This type of imaging allows for tracking movements in the two-dimensional plane of the X-ray. Movements are performed parallel to the camera's imaging plane in order for the motion to be accurately tracked. In gait analysis, planar X-ray studies are done in the sagittal plane to allow for highly accurate tracking of large movements. Methods have been developed to allow for estimating all six degrees of freedom of movement from a planar X-ray and a model of the tracked object.

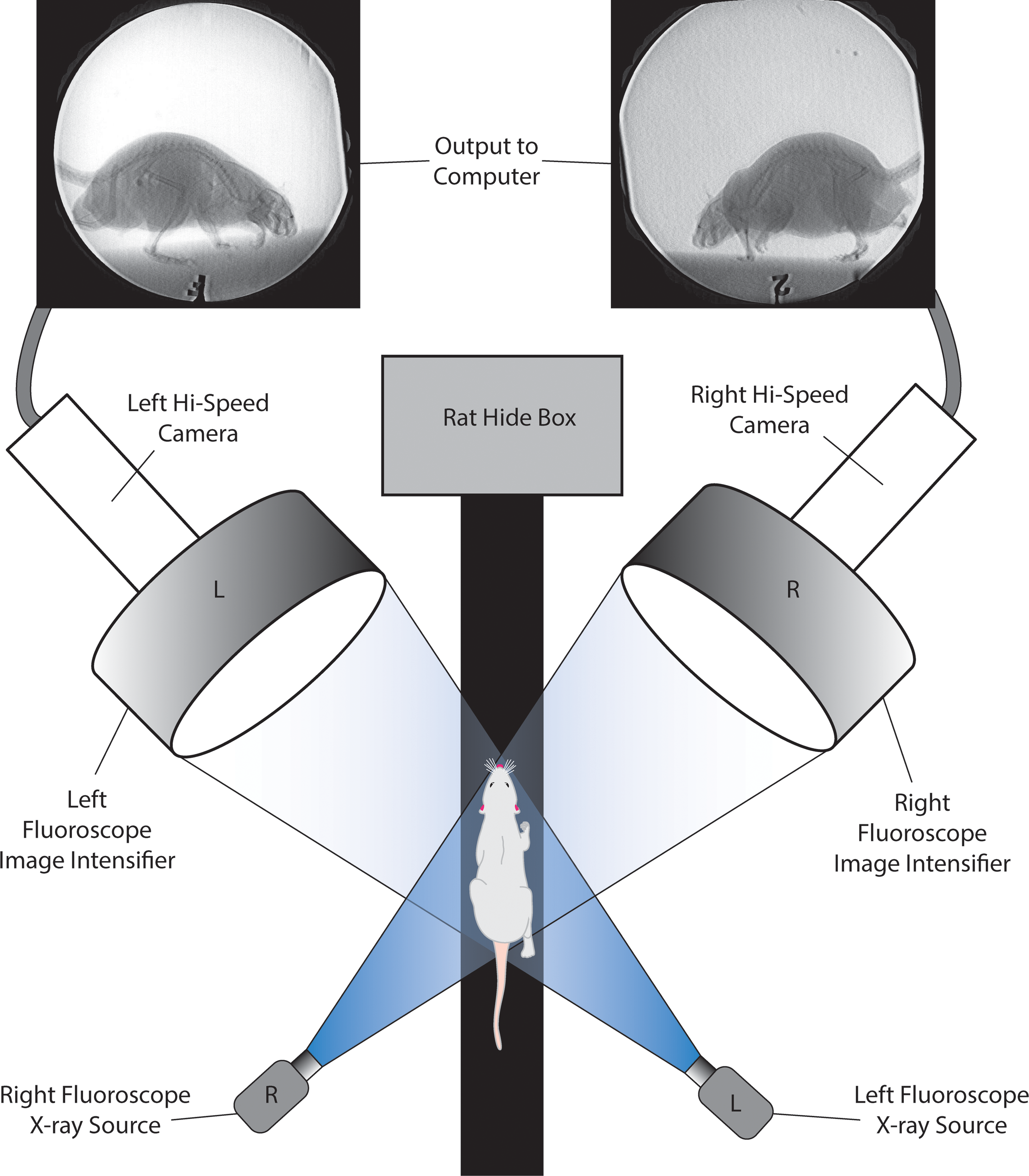
An example of a biplanar fluoroscopy system setup, capturing skeletal movements of a rat on a treadmill.

=== Biplanar ===
Few movements are truly planar; planar X-ray imaging can capture the majority of movement, but not all of it. Accurately capturing and quantifying all three dimensions of movement requires a biplanar imaging system. Biplanar imaging is difficult to perform because many facilities have access to only one X-ray emitter. With the addition of a second X-ray and camera system, the 2-D plane of imaging expands to a 3-D volume of imaging at the intersection of the X-ray beams. Because the volume of imaging is at the intersection of two X-ray beams, the overall size of it is limited by the area of the X-ray emitters.

== Tracking techniques ==
=== Markered ===
Motion capture techniques often use reflective markers for the image capturing. In X-ray imaging, markers that appear opaque in the X-ray images are utilized. This frequently involves using radio-opaque spheres attached to the subject. Markers can be implanted in the subject's bones, which would then appear visible in the X-ray images. This method requires surgical procedures for implanting and a healing period before the subject can undergo a motion analysis. For accurate 3-D tracking, at least three markers need to be implanted onto each bone to be tracked. Markers can also be placed on the subject's skin to track the motion of the underlying bones, though markers placed on the skin are sensitive to skin movement artifacts. These are errors in the measurement of the location of a skin-placed marker compared to a bone-implanted marker. This occurs at locations where soft tissue moves more freely than the overlaying skin. The markers are then tracked relative to the X-ray camera(s) and the motions are mapped to the local anatomical bodies.

=== Markerless ===
Emerging techniques and software are allowing for motion to be tracked without the need for radio-opaque markers. By using a 3-D model of the object being tracked, the object can be overlaid on the images of the X-ray video at each frame. The translations and rotations of the model, as opposed to a set of markers, are then tracked relative to the X-ray camera(s). Using a local coordinate system, these translations and rotations can then be mapped to standard anatomical movements. The 3-D model of the object is generated from any 3-D imaging technique, such as an MRI or CT scan. Markerless tracking has the benefit of being a non-invasive tracking method, avoiding any complications due to surgeries. One difficulty comes from generating the 3-D model in animal studies, as the animals are required to be sedated or sacrificed for the scan.

== Analysis ==
In planar X-ray imaging, the motions of the markers or bodies are tracked in a specialized software. An initial location guess is supplied by the user for the markers or bodies. The software, depending on its capabilities, requires the user to manually locate the markers or bodies for each frame of the video, or can automatically track the locations throughout the video. The automatic tracking has to be monitored for accuracy and may require manually relocating the markers or bodies. After the tracking data is generated for each marker or body of interest, the tracking is applied to the local anatomical bodies. For example, markers placed at the hip and knee would track the motion of the femur. Using knowledge of the local anatomy, these motions can then be translated into anatomical terms of motion in the plane of the X-ray.

In biplanar X-ray imaging, the motions are also tracked in a specialized software. Similar to planar analysis, the user provides an initial location guess and either tracks the markers or bodies manually or the software can automatically track them. However, biplanar analysis requires that all tracking be done on both video frames at the same time, positioning the object in free space. Both X-ray cameras have to be calibrated using an object of known volume. This allows the software to locate the cameras' positions relative to each other and then allows the user to position the 3-D model of the object in line with both video frames. The tracking data is generated for each marker or body and then applied to the local anatomical bodies. The tracking data is then further defined as anatomical terms of motion in free space.

== Applications ==
X-ray motion analysis can be used in human gait analysis to measure the kinematics of the lower limbs. Treadmill gait or overground gait can be measured depending on the mobility of the X-ray system. Other types of movements, such as a jump-cut maneuver, have also been recorded. By combining X-ray motion analysis with force platforms, a joint torque analysis can be performed. Rehabilitation is an important application of X-ray motion analysis. X-ray imaging has been used for medical diagnostic purposes since shortly after its discovery in 1895. X-ray motion analysis can be utilized in joint imaging or analyzing joint-related diseases. It has been used to quantify osteoarthritis in the knee, estimate knee cartilage contact areas, and analyze the results of rotator cuff repair by imaging the shoulder joint, among other applications.

Animal locomotion can also be analyzed with X-ray imaging. As long as the animal can be placed between the X-ray emitter and the camera, the subject can be imaged. Examples of gaits that have been studied are rats, guineafowl, horses, bipedal birds, and frogs, among others. Aside from locomotion, X-ray motion analysis has been utilized in the study and research of other moving morphology analyses, such as pig mastication and movement of the temporomandibular joint in rabbits.

== See also ==
- Video motion analysis
- Roentgen Stereophotogrammetric Analysis
- Radiography
- Fluoroscopy
