= L. C. Schnürlein =

German mathematician

L. C. Schnürlein (fl. nineteenth century) was a German mathematician and educator.

Having studied under Carl Friedrich Gauss, he became a teacher at the gymnasium in Hof, tutoring, among others, Carl Culmann and Philipp Ludwig von Seidel.

== Bibliography ==
- Hartenberg, R. S. (1981) "Cullman, Karl" in Gillespie, C.C., ed. (1981). Dictionary of Scientific Biography. New York: Charles Screibner's Sons. pp. 495–496. ISBN 0-684-16970-3.
- O'Connor, J. J.; Robertson, E. F. (2000). "Philipp Ludwig von Seidel". MacTutor History of Mathematics archive. School of Mathematics and Statistics, University of St Andrews, Scotland.
