= Carl Culmann =

German structural engineer (1821–1881)

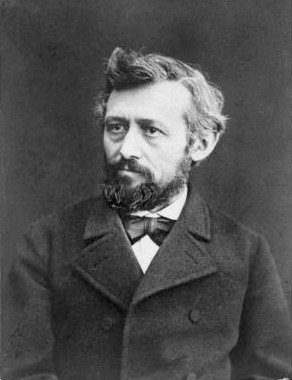
- Born: 10 July 1821; Bad Bergzabern, Germany
- Died: 9 December 1881 (aged 60); Zurich, Switzerland
- Scientific career
- Fields: Structural engineering

Carl Culmann (10 July 1821 – 9 December 1881) was a German structural engineer.

Born in Bad Bergzabern, Rhenish Palatinate, in modern-day Germany, Culmann's father, a pastor, tutored him at home before enrolling him at the military engineering school at Metz to prepare for entry to the École Polytechnique. Culmann's ambitions were frustrated by an attack of typhoid and, after a long convalescence, he attended the Karlsruhe Polytechnic School. He joined the Bavarian civil service in 1841 as an apprentice engineer in the design of railroad bridges.

Continuing his mathematical studies, in particular under L. C. Schnürlein, in 1847 Culmann transferred to Munich so that he could improve his English in anticipation of a study tour to the United Kingdom and the United States. His tour lasted from 1849 to 1851, studying the comparative designs of truss bridges and developing new analytical techniques to facilitate his investigations.

In 1855, he took up the chair of engineering sciences at the Swiss Federal Institute of Technology, Zurich, holding the post until his death.

Inspired by the work of Jean-Victor Poncelet, Culmann was a pioneer of graphical methods in engineering ("graphic statics"), publishing his seminal book on the topic, Die graphische Statik in 1865. A French language translation was prepared in 1879.

Culmann had a profound influence on a generation of engineers including Maurice Koechlin, Otto Mohr and Luigi Cremona. He died in Zurich, Switzerland.

== See also ==
- Biomechanics
- Mechanostat
- Mohr's circle
- Truss

== Bibliography ==
- [Anon.] "Culmann, Carl", Encyclopædia Britannica, Deluxe CDROM edition
- Crystal, David (ed.) (1998) "Culmann, Karl (1821-1881)" The Cambridge Biographical Encyclopedia (2nd ed.) Cambridge University Press, Cambridge, England, ISBN 0-521-63099-1
- Hartenberg, R. S. (1981) "Cullman, Karl" in Gillespie, C.C. (ed.) (1981). Dictionary of Scientific Biography. New York: Charles Screibner's Sons. pp. 495–496. ISBN 0-684-16970-3.
