= Soft tissue =

Tissue in the body that is not hardened by ossification

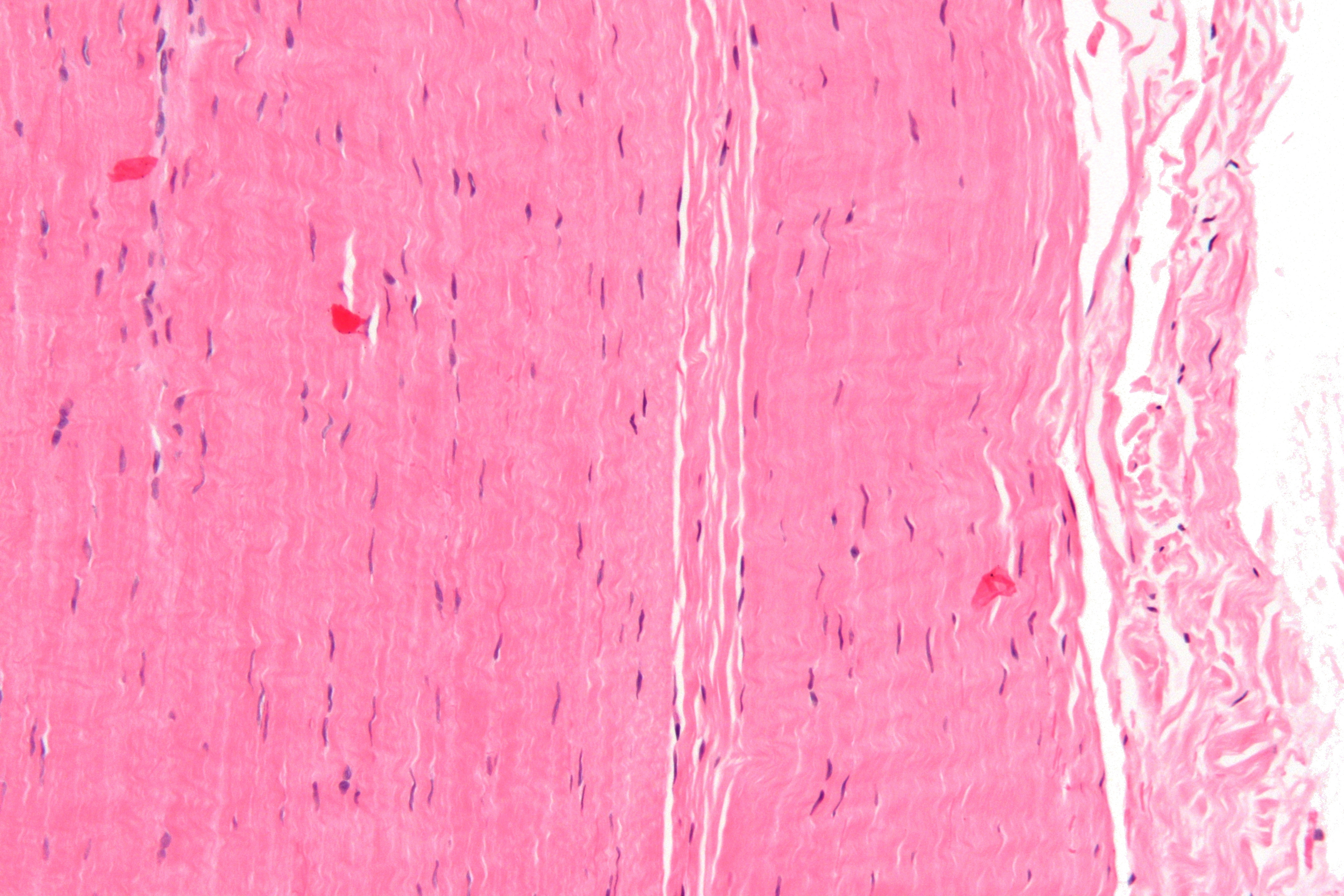
Micrograph of a tendon. Hematoxylin and eosin stain.

Soft tissue is tissue in the body that connects and surrounds or supports internal organs and bones, and includes muscle, tendons, ligaments, fat, fibrous tissue, lymph and blood vessels, fasciae, and synovial membranes. Soft tissue is not hardened by the processes of ossification or calcification such as bones and teeth.

It is sometimes defined by what it is not – such as "nonepithelial, extraskeletal mesenchyme exclusive of the reticuloendothelial system and glia".

== Composition ==
The characteristic substances inside the extracellular matrix of soft tissue are the collagen, elastin and ground substance. Normally the soft tissue is very hydrated because of the ground substance. The fibroblasts are the most common cell responsible for the production of soft tissues' fibers and ground substance. Variations of fibroblasts, like chondroblasts, may also produce these substances.

== Mechanical characteristics ==
At small strains, elastin confers stiffness to the tissue and stores most of the strain energy. The collagen fibers are comparatively inextensible and are usually loose (wavy, crimped). With increasing tissue deformation the collagen is gradually stretched in the direction of deformation. When taut, these fibers produce a strong growth in tissue stiffness. The composite behavior is analogous to a nylon stocking, whose rubber band does the role of elastin as the nylon does the role of collagen. In soft tissues, the collagen limits the deformation and protects the tissues from injury.

Human soft tissue is highly deformable, and its mechanical properties vary significantly from one person to another. Impact testing results showed that the stiffness and the damping resistance of a test subject's tissue are correlated with the mass, velocity, and size of the striking object. Such properties may be useful for forensics investigation when contusions were induced. When a solid object impacts a human soft tissue, the energy of the impact will be absorbed by the tissues to reduce the effect of the impact or the pain level; subjects with more soft tissue thickness tended to absorb the impacts with less aversion.

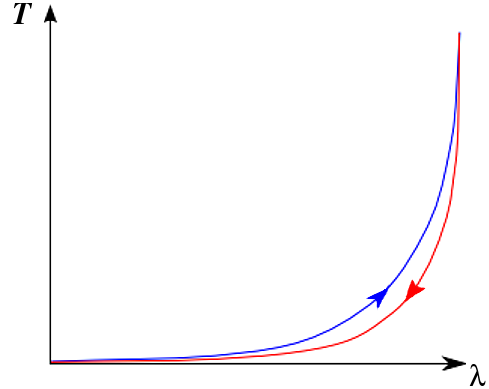
Graph of lagrangian stress (T) versus stretch ratio (λ) of a preconditioned soft tissue

Soft tissues have the potential to undergo large deformations and still return to the initial configuration when unloaded, i.e. they are hyperelastic materials, and their stress-strain curve is nonlinear. The soft tissues are also viscoelastic, incompressible and usually anisotropic. Some viscoelastic properties observable in soft tissues are: relaxation, creep and hysteresis. In order to describe the mechanical response of soft tissues, several methods have been used. These methods include: hyperelastic macroscopic models based on strain energy, mathematical fits where nonlinear constitutive equations are used, and structurally based models where the response of a linear elastic material is modified by its geometric characteristics.

=== Pseudoelasticity ===
Even though soft tissues have viscoelastic properties, i.e. stress as function of strain rate, it can be approximated by a hyperelastic model after precondition to a load pattern. After some cycles of loading and unloading the material, the mechanical response becomes independent of strain rate.

$$\mathbf{S}=\mathbf{S}(\mathbf{E},\dot{\mathbf{E}}) \quad\rightarrow\quad \mathbf{S}=\mathbf{S}(\mathbf{E})$$

Despite the independence of strain rate, preconditioned soft tissues still present hysteresis, so the mechanical response can be modeled as hyperelastic with different material constants at loading and unloading. By this method the elasticity theory is used to model an inelastic material. Fung has called this model as pseudoelastic to point out that the material is not truly elastic.

=== Residual stress ===
In physiological state soft tissues usually present residual stress that may be released when the tissue is excised. Physiologists and histologists must be aware of this fact to avoid mistakes when analyzing excised tissues. This retraction usually causes a visual artifact.

=== Fung-elastic material ===
Fung developed a constitutive equation for preconditioned soft tissues which is

$$W = \frac{1}{2}\left[q + c\left( e^Q -1 \right) \right]$$

with

$$q=a_{ijkl}E_{ij}E_{kl} \qquad Q=b_{ijkl}E_{ij}E_{kl}$$

quadratic forms of Green-Lagrange strains $E_{ij}$ and $a_{ijkl}$, $b_{ijkl}$ and $c$ material constants. $W$ is the strain energy function per volume unit, which is the mechanical strain energy for a given temperature.

==== Isotropic simplification ====
The Fung-model, simplified with isotropic hypothesis (same mechanical properties in all directions). This written in respect of the principal stretches ($\lambda_i$):

$$W = \frac{1}{2}\left[a(\lambda_1^2 + \lambda_2^2 + \lambda_3^2 - 3) + b\left( e^{c(\lambda_1^2 + \lambda_2^2 + \lambda_3^2 - 3)} -1 \right) \right]$$,

where a, b and c are constants.

==== Simplification for small and big stretches ====
For small strains, the exponential term is very small, thus negligible.

$$W = \frac{1}{2}a_{ijkl}E_{ij}E_{kl}$$

On the other hand, the linear term is negligible when the analysis rely only on big strains.

$$W = \frac{1}{2}c\left( e^{b_{ijkl}E_{ij}E_{kl}} -1 \right)$$

=== Gent-elastic material ===
$$W = - \frac{\mu J_m}{2} \ln \left(1 - \left( \frac{\lambda_1^2 + \lambda_2^2 + \lambda_3^2 - 3}{J_m} \right) \right)$$

where $\mu > 0$ is the shear modulus for infinitesimal strains and $J_m > 0$ is a stiffening parameter, associated with limiting chain extensibility. This constitutive model cannot be stretched in uni-axial tension beyond a maximal stretch $J_m$, which is the positive root of

$$\lambda_m^2 + 2\lambda_m - J_m - 3 = 1$$

== Remodeling and growth ==
Soft tissues have the potential to grow and remodel reacting to chemical and mechanical long term changes. The rate the fibroblasts produce tropocollagen is proportional to these stimuli. Diseases, injuries and changes in the level of mechanical load may induce remodeling. An example of this phenomenon is the thickening of farmer's hands. The remodeling of connective tissues is well known in bones by the Wolff's law (bone remodeling). Mechanobiology is the science that study the relation between stress and growth at cellular level.

Growth and remodeling have a major role in the cause of some common soft tissue diseases, like arterial stenosis and aneurisms and any soft tissue fibrosis. Other instance of tissue remodeling is the thickening of the cardiac muscle in response to the growth of blood pressure detected by the arterial wall.

== Imaging techniques ==
Certain issues impact the choice of imaging technique for visualizing soft tissue extracellular matrix (ECM) components. The accuracy of the image analysis relies on the properties and the quality of the raw data and, therefore, the choice of the imaging technique must be based upon issues such as:

1. Having an optimal resolution for the components of interest;
2. Achieving high contrast of those components;
3. Keeping the artifact count low;
4. Having the option of volume data acquisition;
5. Keeping the data volume low;
6. Establishing an easy and reproducible setup for tissue analysis.

The collagen fibers are approximately 1–2 μm thick. Thus, the resolution of the imaging technique needs to be approximately 0.5 μm. Some techniques allow the direct acquisition of volume data while other need the slicing of the specimen. In both cases, the volume that is extracted must be able to follow the fiber bundles across the volume. High contrast makes segmentation easier, especially when color information is available. In addition, the need for fixation must also be addressed. It has been shown that soft tissue fixation in formalin causes shrinkage, altering the structure of the original tissue. Some typical values of contraction for different fixation are: formalin (5% - 10%), alcohol (10%), bouin (<5%). Imaging methods used in ECM visualization and their properties.

	Transmission Light	Confocal	Multi-Photon Excitation Fluorescence	Second Harmonic Generation	Optical coherence tomography
Resolution	0.25 μm	Axial: 0.25–0.5 μm Lateral: 1 μm	Axial: 0.5 μm Lateral: 1 μm	Axial: 0.5 μm Lateral: 1 μm	Axial: 3–15 μm Lateral: 1–15 μm
Contrast	Very High	Low	High	High	Moderate
Penetration	N/A	10 μm–300 μm	100–1000 μm	100–1000 μm	Up to 2–3 mm
Image stack cost	High	Low	Low	Low	Low
Fixation	Required	Required	Not required	Not required	Not required
Embedding	Required	Required	Not required	Not required	Not required
Staining	Required	Not required	Not required	Not required	Not required
Cost	Low	Moderate to high	High	High	Moderate

== Clinical significance ==
Soft tissue disorders are medical conditions affecting soft tissue. Soft tissue injuries are some of the most chronically painful and difficult conditions to treat because it is very difficult to see what is going on under the skin with the soft connective tissues, fascia, joints, muscles and tendons.

Musculoskeletal specialists, manual therapists, neuromuscular physiologists and neurologists specialize in treating injuries and ailments in the soft tissue areas of the body. These specialized clinicians often develop innovative ways to manipulate the soft tissue to speed natural healing and relieve the mysterious pain that often accompanies soft tissue injuries. This area of expertise has become known as soft tissue therapy and is rapidly expanding as technology continues to improve the ability of these specialists to identify problem areas.

A promising new method of treating wounds and soft tissue injuries is via platelet-derived growth factor.

There is a close overlap between the term "soft tissue disorder" and rheumatism. Sometimes the term "soft tissue rheumatic disorders" is used to describe these conditions.

Soft tissue sarcomas are many types of cancer that can develop in the soft tissues.

== See also ==
- Biomaterial
- Biomechanics
- Davis's law
- Rheology
