= Osteogenic loading =

Rehabilitative exercise

Osteogenic loading (OL) is a rehabilitative exercise method with the goal of improving bone density and preventing bone fracture. This may be seen as brief, intensive, resistance exercise for bone health.

Osteogenic loading is an outpatient therapy that typically is used with ambulatory individuals who are able to engage in resistance exercise. Loading exercise for bone density preservation and improvement is supported by bone health societies and organizations, including the International Osteoporosis Foundation, the National Osteoporosis Foundation, the National Osteoporosis Society of the United Kingdom, and the World Health Organization. Fitness Centers, such as Osteostrong, the Bone Gym of New York, BoneFit, and the Wellness Lab of New Mexico have piloted programs to utilize osteogenic loading to increase bone density without pharmaceutical interventions using vibration plates, bioDensity equipment, or careful weightlifting.

The basis of osteogenic loading stems from Wolff's law, which shows that the force or loading on bone through its axis, can stimulate the bone's natural function of increasing in density. Further study has shown that greater loads on bone can stimulate a greater effect of the body to respond and increase the density of bone, and can show immediate effects in the body via blood testing showing bone turnover markers. Typically, this high level of loading on bone would be seen in high-impact activity that, given the risk of injury potential, is not practical for therapy.
