= Henry Gassett Davis =

American orthopedic surgeon (1807–1896)

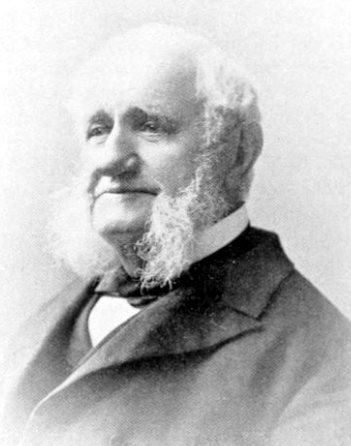
- Born: November 4, 1807; Trenton, Massachusetts
- Died: November 17, 1896 (aged 89); Everett, Massachusetts
- Occupation: Orthopedic surgeon
- Known for: Founding traction school of orthopedic surgery Creating the splint for traction and protection of the hip joint
- Spouse: Ellen W. Deering (m. 1857)

Henry Gassett Davis (November 4, 1807 – November 17, 1896) was an American orthopedic surgeon.

He founded the traction school of orthopedic surgery and created the first splint for traction and protection of the hip joint. Davis is also known for his work in studying soft tissue adaptation (see Davis' law).

== Early life ==
Henry was born in Trenton, Massachusetts on November 4, 1807, a later descendant of Dolor Davis of early Cape Cod, Massachusetts. As a boy he intended to be a mechanic and a manufacturer of cotton bagging, similar to his father. But upon visiting his sister, diagnosed with a difficult case of scoliosis, he abandoned his earlier goals to pursue medicine.

In March 1839 he received his MD from Yale School of Medicine with clinical training at Bellevue Hospital in New York City.

He married Ellen W. Deering in 1857, and they had three children.

== Career ==
He was a practitioner and surgeon in both Worcester and Millbury, Massachusetts for fifteen years. He then settled in New York City where he specialized in orthopedic medicine.

While in Millbury, he grew interested in the treatment of fractures and deformities and advocated the use of continuous traction to correct deformities and relieve joint discomfort. His successful work with weights and pulleys preceded Gurdon Buck's similar introductions of 1860. His practice bloomed and he soon opened a private hospital at 37th Street and Madison Avenue in Manhattan primarily for foreign patients.

His beliefs formed the basis for the modern day approaches to such medical conditions as club foot, congenital dislocation of the hip, chronic joint diseases and poliomyelitis-related deformities. He recommended opening and evacuating abscesses and washing them with warm water and chlorine, an early form of the more modern Carrel-Dakin method of wound treatment.

His work influenced the future orthopedic practices of Lewis A. Sayre, Charles Fayette Taylor and Edward Hickling Bradford. He was a member of local medical societies of New York City and was an honorarily elected member of the then newly formed American Orthopedic Association in 1895. In addition, he may have once suggested to railroad engineers to elevate the outer rails of curved sections of rail lines.

He died at his home in Everett, Massachusetts on November 17, 1896.

== Written works ==
- On the effect of pressure upon ulcerated vertebræ, and in morbus coxarius, and the relief afforded by mechanical remedies, with cases. New York: T. Holman, 1859.
- Medical testimony in regard to Dr. Davis's new mode of treating joint diseases. New York: Hall, Clayton, & Medole, 186-?
- Medical testimony in regard to the proper mechanical treatment of joint diseases. New York: Hall, Clayton & Medole, 1862?
- The American method of treating joint diseases and deformities. Philadelphia: Collins, 1863.
