= Stress–strain index =

Measure of bone strength

The stress–strain index (SSI) of a bone is a surrogate measure of bone strength determined from a cross-sectional scan by QCT or pQCT (radiological scan). The stress–strain index is used to compare the structural parameters determined by analysis of QCT/pQCT cross-sectional scans to the results of three-point bending test.

== Definition ==
It is calculated using the following formula:

$$\text{SSI} = \sum_{i=0}^n {{r_i^2 a (\frac{CD}{ND})} \over {r_\text{max}}}$$

Where:

- r_{max} is the distance of voxel from centre
- CD is the apparent cortical (bone) density
- ND is the normal (cortical bone) density
- r_{i} is the pixel position from the centre
- a is the area of a pixel

== History and relation to moments of inertia ==
It was developed by the manufacturer of a peripheral quantitative CT (pQCT) scanner, and is considered to be by some an improvement over the information provided by calculating the area moments of inertia and polar moments of inertia.
