= Mechanostat =

The mechanostat is a term describing the way in which mechanical loading influences bone structure by changing the mass (amount of bone) and architecture (its arrangement) to provide a structure that resists habitual loads with an economical amount of material. As changes in the skeleton are accomplished by the processes of formation (bone growth) and resorption (bone loss), the mechanostat models the effect of influences on the skeleton by those processes, through their effector cells, osteocytes, osteoblasts, and osteoclasts. The term was invented by Harold Frost: an orthopaedic surgeon and researcher described extensively in articles referring to Frost and Webster Jee's Utah Paradigm of Skeletal Physiology in the 1960s. The mechanostat is often defined as a practical description of Wolff's law described by Julius Wolff (1836–1902), but this is not completely accurate. Wolff wrote his treatises on bone after images of bone sections were described by Culmann and von Meyer, who suggested that the arrangement of the struts (trabeculae) at the ends of the bones were aligned with the stresses experienced by the bone. It has since been established that the static methods used for those calculations of lines of stress were inappropriate for work on what were, in effect, curved beams, a finding described by Lance Lanyon, a leading researcher in the area as "a triumph of a good idea over mathematics." While Wolff pulled together the work of Culmann and von Meyer, it was the French scientist Roux, who first used the term "functional adaptation" to describe the way that the skeleton optimized itself for its function, though Wolff is credited by many for that.

According to the mechanostat, bone growth and bone loss is stimulated by the local, mechanical, elastic deformation of bone. The reason for the elastic deformation of bone is the peak forces caused by muscles (e.g. measurable using mechanography). The adaptation (feed-back control loop) of bone according to the maximum forces is considered to be a lifelong process. Hence, bone adapts its mechanical properties according to the needed mechanical function: bone mass, bone geometry, and bone strength (see also Stress-strain index, SSI) adapt to everyday usage/needs. "Maximal force" in this context is a simplification of the real input to bone that initiates adaptive changes. While the magnitude of a force (the weight of a load for example) is an important determinant of its effect on the skeleton, it is not the only one. The rate of application of force is also critical. Slow application of force over several seconds is not experienced by bone cells as a stimulus, but they are sensitive to very rapid application of forces (such as impacts) even of lower magnitude. High frequency vibration of bone at very low magnitudes is thought to stimulate changes, but the research in the area is not completely unequivocal. It is clear that bones respond better to loading/exercise with gaps between individual events, so that two loads separated by ten seconds of rest are more potent stimuli than ten loads within the same ten seconds.

Due to this control loop, there is a linear relationship in the healthy body between muscle cross sectional area (as a surrogate for typical maximum forces the muscle is able to produce under physiological conditions) and the bone cross sectional area (as a surrogate for bone strength).

These relations are of immense importance, especially for conditions of bone loss like osteoporosis, since an adapted training utilizing the needed maximum forces on the bone can be used to stimulate bone growth and thereby prevent or help to minimize bone loss. An example for such an efficient training is vibration training or whole body vibration.

== Modeling and remodeling ==
Frost defined four regions of elastic bone deformation which result in different consequences on the control loop:

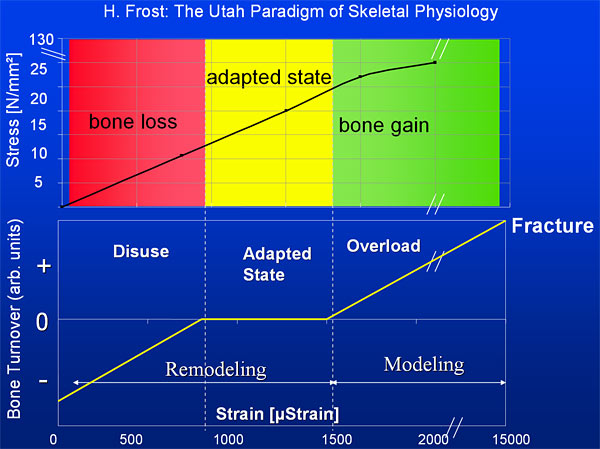
Mechanostat: modeling and remodeling thresholds

- Disuse:
  Strain < circa 800μStrain: Remodeling (bone adaptation and bone repair), bone mass and bone strength is reduced.
- Adapted:
  Strain between circa 800μStrain and circa 1500μStrain: Remodeling (bone repair), bone mass and bone strength stays constant (homeostasis: bone resorption = bone formation).
- Overload:
  Strain > circa 1500μStrain: Modeling (bone growth): bone mass and bone strength is increased.
- Fracture:
  Strain > circa 15000μStrain: Maximum elastic deformation exceeded, causing bone fracture.

According to this, a typical bone (e.g., the tibia) has a security margin of about 5 to 7 between typical load (2000 to 3000 μStrain) and fracture load (about 15000μStrain).

The comments above are all one part of how the skeleton responds to loading, because the different bones of the skeleton have a range of habitual strain environments (encompassing magnitude, rate, frequency, rest periods, etc.), and they are not uniform. The numbers in the table are only theoretical and may reflect the response of the center of a long bone under specific circumstances. Other parts of the same bone and other bones in the same individual experience different loading and adapt to them despite different thresholds between disuse, maintenance and adaptive formation. Furthermore, bone structure is controlled by a complex series of different influences, such as calcium status, the effects of hormones, age, diet, sex, disease, and pharmaceuticals. A bone experiencing what would in some circumstances be seen as a stimulus to form more material could either be maintained at a constant level where circulating calcium was low, or the same loading could merely temper the amount of resorption experienced in an old person with a bone-wasting disease.

== Unit: Strain E ==
The elastic deformation of bone is measured in μStrain. 1000μStrain = 0.1% change of length of the bone.

- Strain E at length l and change of length Δl: $E = \frac{\Delta l}{l}$

It has to be considered that bone strength is highly dependent on geometry and direction of the acting forces in relation to this geometry. The fracture load for axial forces of the tibia for example is about 50 to 60 times the body weight. The fracture load for forces perpendicular to the axial direction is about 10 times lower.

Different types of bones can have different modeling and remodeling thresholds. The modeling threshold of the tibia is about 1500 μStrain (0.15% change of length), while the modeling threshold for parts of the bones of the skull is quite different. Some parts of the skull such as the lower jaw (mandible) experience significant forces and strains during chewing, but the dome of the cranium must remain strong to protect the brain, even if it does not experience what would be seen as stimulating strains. In one study where the strains were measured in the skull of a live human, it was shown that strains in the skull never exceeded 1/10 of the peak strain in the tibia of the same individual, with similar differences in strain rates. This suggests that either bones of the skull are very sensitive to extremely low strains, or that the "genetic baseline" amount of bone in the skull in what is effectively disuse is not modified by the effects of loading. Whether the skulls of boxers are thicker than normal individuals is an intriguing question that has not been answered.

Since the physical, material properties of bone are not altered in the different bone types of the body, this difference in modeling threshold results in an increased bone mass and bone strength, thus in an increased safety factor (relation between fracture load and typical loads) for the skull compared to the tibia. A lower modeling threshold means that the same typical daily forces result in a ‘thicker’ and hence stronger bone at the skull.

== Examples ==
Typical examples of the influence of maximum forces and the resulting elastic deformations on bone growth or bone loss are extended flights of astronauts and cosmonauts, as well as patients with paraplegia due to an accident. Extended periods in free fall do not lead to loss of bone from the skull, providing support to the idea that its bone is maintained by a genetic not a mechanical influence (skull bone often increases in long term space flights, something thought to be related to fluid shifts within the body).

A paraplegic patient in a wheelchair who is using his arms but not his legs will suffer massive muscle and bone loss in only his legs, due to the lack of usage of the legs. However, the muscles and bones of the arms which are used every day will stay the same, or might even increase, depending on the usage.

The same effect can be observed for long flight astronauts or cosmonauts. While they still use their arms in an almost normal manner, due to the lack of gravity in space there are no maximum forces induced on the bones of the legs. On earth, long term players of racquet sports experience similar effects, where the dominant arm can have 30% more bone than the other due to the asymmetric applications of force.

Harold Frost applied the mechanostat model not only to skeletal tissues, but also to fibrous, collagenous connective tissues, such as ligaments, tendons, and fascia. He described their adaptational responsiveness to strain in his "stretch-hypertrophy rule":

"Intermittent stretch causes collagenous tissues to hypertrophy until the resulting increase in strength reduces elongation in tension to some minimum level".

Similar to the responsiveness of bony tissues, this adaptational response occurs only if the mechanical strain exceeds a certain threshold value. Harold Frost proposed that for dense, collagenous connective tissues, the related threshold value is around 4% strain elongation.
