= Harold Frost =

American orthopedist and surgeon

Harold M. Frost (1921 – 19 June 2004) was an American orthopedist and surgeon considered to be one of the most important researchers and theorists in the field of bone biology and bone medicine of his time. He published nearly 500 peer-reviewed scientific and clinical articles and 16 books. According to the Science Citation Index, he is one of the most cited investigators in skeletal research.

== Life ==
He received his medical degree from Geisel School of Medicine and Feinberg School of Medicine in 1945. He then did his surgical internship in Worcester, Massachusetts. During this time, he served as an officer in the Naval Medical Corps from 1946 to 1948. He then pursued a residency in Orthopedic Surgery in Buffalo General and Children's Hospital in New York state from 1948 to 1953. In 1955, he became an assistant professor of orthopedic surgery at the Yale School of Medicine.

Frost moved to Detroit to take a position at Henry Ford Hospital. There he became the founder and Director of the Orthopedic Research Laboratory. He remained the director until 1973, having served as chairman of the department from 1966 until 1972.

During his time at the Henry Ford Hospital, Frost made many breakthroughs, which changed the paradigm of bone biology.

Frost moved to Pueblo, Colorado in 1973 — drawn by the mountains, climate, and lifestyle — bringing with him his international reputation as a dogged researcher, talented orthopaedist and prolific author. While there he continued his active participation at the Sun Valley Workshops where he interacted with participants to develop cancellous bone histomorphomety (1977), generate and refine the mechanostat hypothesis (1987), and the ever-evolving Utah Paradigm of Bone Physiology (1997).

== Academic contributions ==
Dr. Harold M. Frost's main academic inputs include:

- Development of Bone Histomorphometry for description of cellular based bone formation and Bone resorption processes
- the eleventh rip Biopsy used for diagnosis of metabolic Bone diseases
- Research on the multi-cellular unit as a key to bone metabolism
- the experimental proof that Estrogen reduces bone formation
- the histological proof of micro-damages in human bone biopsies
- the basic model of the adaptation of the Growth plate to mechanical stress
- the Utah-Paradigm of Bone physiology (Mechanostat-Theorem), an enhancement of Wolff's law stating that Bone adapts to mechanical stress and that hence there is a close link between muscle and bone

== Books ==
- Bone remodelling dynamics, The Henry Ford Hospital surgical monographs, Thomas (Springfield, Ill.), 1963
- The laws of bone structure, The Henry Ford Hospital surgical monographs, Thomas (Springfield, Ill.), 1964
- Mathematical Elements of Lamellar Bone Remodelling, The Henry Ford Hospital surgical monographs, Thomas (Springfield, Ill.), 1964
- Bone biodynamics, Henry Ford Hospital international symposium, [14], Little, Brown (Boston) 1964
- The bone dynamics in osteoporosis and osteomalacia, The Henry Ford Hospital surgical monographs, Thomas (Springfield, Ill.), 1966
- An introduction to biomechanics, Surgical monographs, Thomas (Springfield, Ill.), 1967, 0398028249
- Orthopaedic surgery in spasticity (Orthopaedic lectures Vol. 1), Thomas (Springfield, Ill.), 1972
- The physiology of cartilaginous, fibrous, and bony tissue (Orthopaedic lectures Vol. 2), Thomas (Springfield, Ill.), 1972, ISBN 0-398-02562-2
- Bone remodeling and its relationship to metabolic bone diseases (Orthopaedic lectures Vol. 3), Thomas (Springfield, Ill.), 1973, ISBN 0-398-02588-6
- Bone modeling and skeletal modeling errors (Orthopaedic lectures Vol. 4), Thomas (Springfield, Ill.), 1973, ISBN 0-398-02667-X
- Orthopaedic Biomechanics (Orthopaedic Lectures Vol. 5), Thomas (Springfield, Ill.), 1973, ISBN 0-398-02824-9
- Symposium on the Osteoporoses Part 1: Physioplogy, Pathophysiology, and Diagnosis, Saunders (Philadelphia), 1981
- Symposium on the Osteoporoses Part 2: Therapy and Prevention, Saunders (Philadelphia), 1981
- Intermediary organization of the skeleton, CRC Press (Boca Raton, Fla), 1986, ISBN 0-8493-5948-1
- Bone in clinical orthopedics - Chapter 14: Determinants of bone strength and mass: a summary and clinical implications by Geoff Sumner-Smith, Georg Thieme Verlag, 2002, ISBN 0-86577-829-9,
- The Utah Paradigm of Skeletal Physiology Vol. 1, ISMNI
- The Utah Paradigm of Skeletal Physiology Vol. 2, ISMNI
