= Wolff's law =

Law stating that bone adapts to mechanical loading

Wolff's law, developed by the German anatomist and surgeon Julius Wolff (1836–1902) in the 19th century, states that bone in a healthy animal will adapt to the loads under which it is placed. If loading on a particular bone increases, the bone will remodel itself over time to become stronger to resist that sort of loading. The internal architecture of the trabeculae undergoes adaptive changes, followed by secondary changes to the external cortical portion of the bone, perhaps becoming thicker as a result. The inverse is true as well: if the loading on a bone decreases, the bone will become less dense and weaker due to the lack of the stimulus required for continued remodeling. This reduction in bone density (osteopenia) is known as stress shielding and can occur as a result of a hip replacement (or other prosthesis). The normal stress on a bone is shielded from that bone by being placed on a prosthetic implant.

== Mechanotransduction ==
The remodeling of bone in response to loading is achieved via mechanotransduction, a process through which forces or other mechanical signals are converted to biochemical signals in cellular signaling. Mechanotransduction leading to bone remodeling involves the steps of mechanocoupling, biochemical coupling, signal transmission, and cell response. The specific effects on bone structure depend on the duration, magnitude, and rate of loading, and it has been found that only cyclic loading can induce bone formation. When loaded, fluid flows away from areas of high compressive loading in the bone matrix. Osteocytes are the most abundant cells in bone and are also the most sensitive to such fluid flow caused by mechanical loading. Upon sensing a load, osteocytes regulate bone remodeling by signaling to other cells with signaling molecules or direct contact. Additionally, osteoprogenitor cells, which may differentiate into osteoblasts or osteoclasts, are also mechanosensors and will differentiate depending on the loading condition.

Computational models suggest that mechanical feedback loops can stably regulate bone remodeling by reorienting trabeculae in the direction of the mechanical loads.

== Associated laws ==
- In relation to soft tissue, Davis' law explains how soft tissue remodels itself according to imposed demands.
- Refinement of Wolff's Law: Utah-Paradigm of Bone physiology (Mechanostat Theorem) by Harold Frost.

== Examples ==
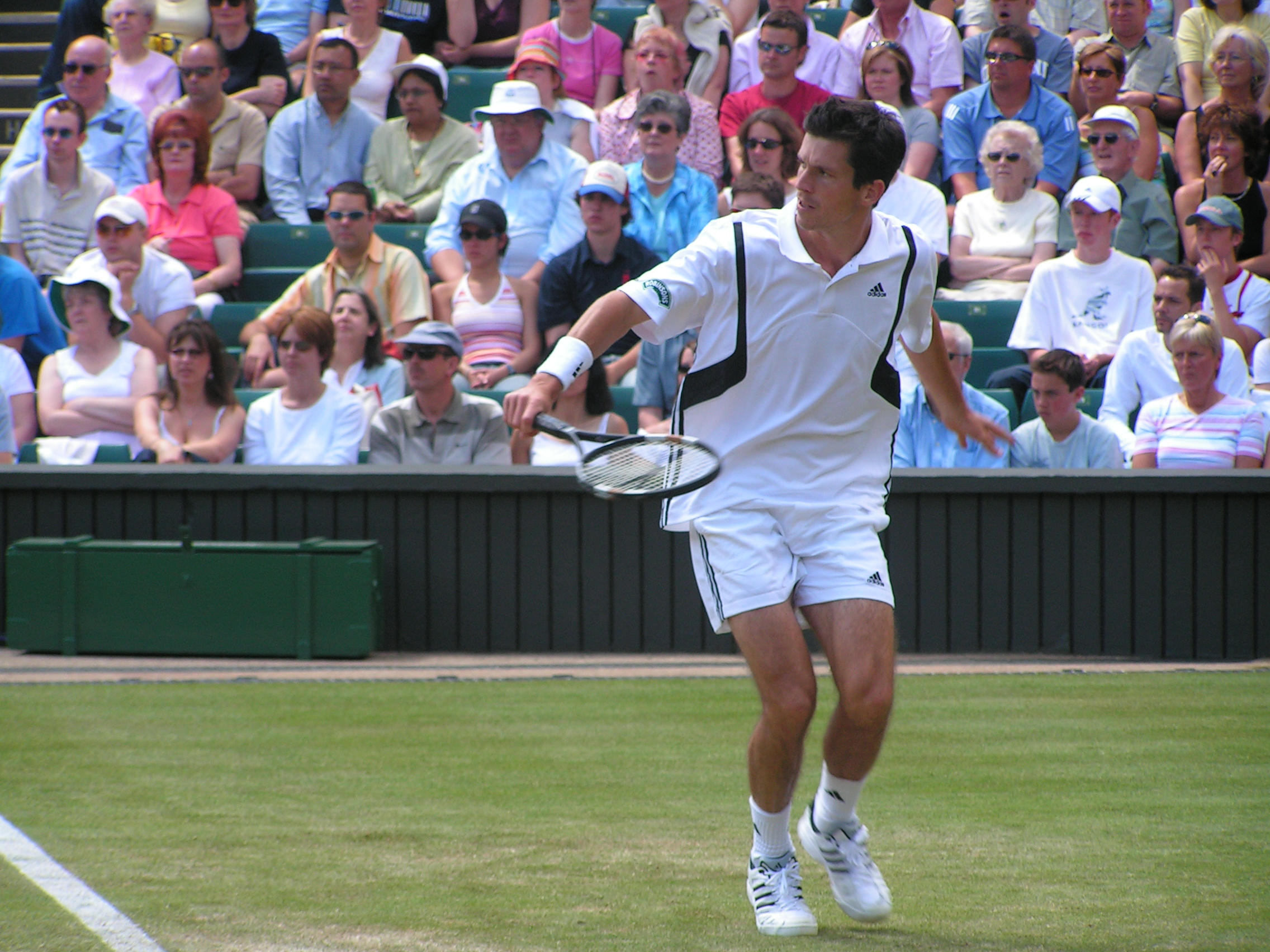
Tennis players often use one arm more than the other

- The racquet-holding arm bones of tennis players become stronger than those of the other arm. Their bodies have strengthened the bones in their racquet-holding arm, since it is routinely placed under higher than normal stresses. The most critical loads on a tennis player's arms occur during the serve. There are four main phases of a tennis serve, and the highest loads occur during external shoulder rotation and ball impact. The combination of high load and arm rotation results in a twisted bone density profile.
- Weightlifters often display increases in bone density in response to their training.
- Astronauts often suffer from the reverse: being in a microgravity environment, they tend to lose bone density.
- The deforming effects of torticollis on craniofacial development in children.

== See also ==
- Functional matrix hypothesis
- Iron Shirt, Wushu/Kungfu bone conditioning
- Osteogenic loading
