= Stem-cell niche =

Specific location in the body containing stem cells

Stem-cell niche refers to a microenvironment, within the specific anatomic location where stem cells are found, which interacts with stem cells to regulate cell fate. The word 'niche' can be in reference to the in vivo or in vitro stem-cell microenvironment. During embryonic development, various niche factors act on embryonic stem cells to alter gene expression, and induce their proliferation or differentiation for the development of the fetus. Within the human body, stem-cell niches maintain adult stem cells in a quiescent state, but after tissue injury, the surrounding micro-environment actively signals to stem cells to promote either self-renewal or differentiation to form new tissues. Several factors are important to regulate stem-cell characteristics within the niche: cell–cell interactions between stem cells, as well as interactions between stem cells and neighbouring differentiated cells, interactions between stem cells and adhesion molecules, extracellular matrix components, the oxygen tension, growth factors, cytokines, and the physicochemical nature of the environment including the pH, ionic strength (e.g. Ca2+ concentration) and metabolites, like ATP, are also important. The stem cells and niche may induce each other during development and reciprocally signal to maintain each other during adulthood.

Scientists are studying the various components of the niche and trying to replicate the in vivo niche conditions in vitro. This is because for regenerative therapies, cell proliferation and differentiation must be controlled in flasks or plates, so that sufficient quantity of the proper cell type are produced prior to being introduced back into the patient for therapy.

Human embryonic stem cells are often grown in fibrotastic growth factor-2 containing, fetal bovine serum supplemented media. They are grown on a feeder layer of cells, which is believed to be supportive in maintaining the pluripotent characteristics of embryonic stem cells. However, even these conditions may not truly mimic in vivo niche conditions.

Adult stem cells remain in an undifferentiated state throughout adult life. However, when they are cultured in vitro, they often undergo an 'aging' process in which their morphology is changed and their proliferative capacity is decreased. It is believed that correct culturing conditions of adult stem cells needs to be improved so that adult stem cells can maintain their stemness over time.

A Nature Insight review defines niche as follows:

"Stem-cell populations are established in 'niches' — specific anatomic locations that regulate how they participate in tissue generation, maintenance and repair. The niche saves stem cells from depletion, while protecting the host from over-exuberant stem-cell proliferation. It constitutes a basic unit of tissue physiology, integrating signals that mediate the balanced response of stem cells to the needs of organisms. Yet the niche may also induce pathologies by imposing aberrant function on stem cells or other targets. The interplay between stem cells and their niche creates the dynamic system necessary for sustaining tissues, and for the ultimate design of stem-cell therapeutics ... The simple location of stem cells is not sufficient to define a niche. The niche must have both anatomic and functional dimensions."

== History ==
Though the concept of stem cell niche was prevailing in vertebrates, the first characterization of stem cell niche in vivo was worked out in Drosophila germinal development.

== The architecture of the stem-cell niche ==
By continuous intravital imaging in mice, researchers were able to explore the structure of the stem cell niche and to obtain the fate of individual stem cells (SCs) and their progeny over time in vivo. In particular in intestinal crypt, two distinct groups of SCs have been identified: the "border stem cells" located in the upper part of the niche at the interface with transit amplifying cells (TAs), and "central stem cells" located at the crypt base. The proliferative potential of the two groups was unequal and correlated with the cells' location (central or border). It was also shown that the two SC compartments acted in accord to maintain a constant cell population and a steady cellular turnover. A similar dependence of self-renewal potential on proximity to the niche border was reported in the context of hair follicle, in an in vivo live-imaging study.

This bi-compartmental structure of stem cell niche has been mathematically modeled to obtain the optimal architecture that leads to the maximum delay in double-hit mutant production. They found that the bi-compartmental SC architecture minimizes the rate of two-hit mutant production compared to the single SC compartment model. Moreover, the minimum probability of double-hit mutant generation corresponds to purely symmetric division of SCs with a large proliferation rate of border stem cells along with a small, but non-zero, proliferation rate of central stem cells.

Stem cell niches harboring continuously dividing cells, such as those located at the base of the intestinal gland, are maintained at small population size. This presents a challenge to the maintenance of multicellular tissues, as small populations of asexually dividing individuals will accumulate deleterious mutations through genetic drift and succumb to mutational meltdown. Mathematical modeling of the intestinal gland reveals that the small population size within the stem cell niche minimizes the probability of carcinogenesis occurring anywhere, at the expense of gradually accumulated deleterious mutations throughout organismal lifetime—a process that contributes to tissue degradation and aging. Therefore, the population size of the stem cell niche represents an evolutionary trade-off between the probability of cancer formation and the rate of aging.

== Examples ==
=== Germline ===
Germline stem cells (GSCs) are found in organisms that continuously produce sperm and eggs until they are sterile. These specialized stem cells reside in the GSC niche, the initial site for gamete production, which is composed of the GSCs, somatic stem cells, and other somatic cells. In particular, the GSC niche is well studied in the genetic model organism Drosophila melanogaster and has provided an extensive understanding of the molecular basis of stem cell regulation.

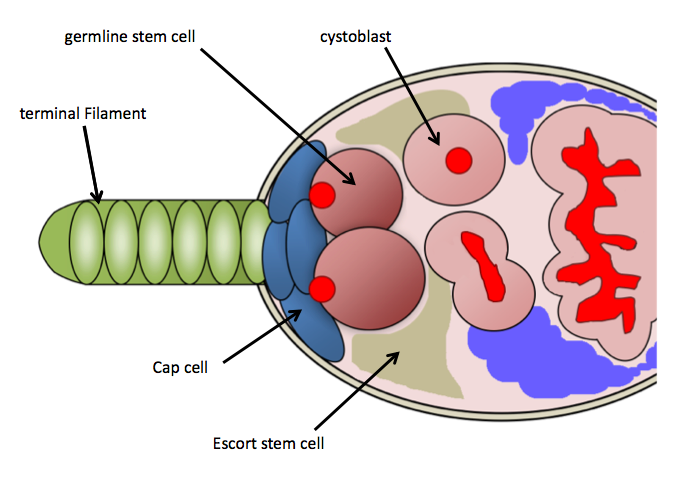
GSC niche in"Drosophila melanogaster" germarium

=== GSC niche in Drosophila ovaries ===
In Drosophila melanogaster, the GSC niche resides in the anterior-most region of each ovariole, known as the germarium. The GSC niche consists of necessary somatic cells-terminal filament cells, cap cells, escort cells, and other stem cells which function to maintain the GSCs. The GSC niche holds on average 2–3 GSCs, which are directly attached to somatic cap cells and Escort stem cells, which send maintenance signals directly to the GSCs. GSCs are easily identified through histological staining against vasa protein (to identify germ cells) and 1B1 protein (to outline cell structures and a germline specific fusome structure). Their physical attachment to the cap cells is necessary for their maintenance and activity. A GSC will divide asymmetrically to produce one daughter cystoblast, which then undergoes 4 rounds of incomplete mitosis as it progresses down the ovariole (through the process of oogenesis) eventually emerging as a mature egg chamber; the fusome found in the GSCs functions in cyst formation and may regulate asymmetrical cell divisions of the GSCs. Because of the abundant genetic tools available for use in Drosophila melanogaster and the ease of detecting GSCs through histological stainings, researchers have uncovered several molecular pathways controlling GSC maintenance and activity.

==== Molecular mechanisms of GSC maintenance and activity ====
===== Local signals =====
The Bone Morphogenetic Protein (BMP) ligands Decapentaplegic (Dpp) and Glass-bottom-boat (Gbb) ligand are directly signalled to the GSCs, and are essential for GSC maintenance and self-renewal. BMP signalling in the niche functions to directly repress expression of Bag-of-marbles (Bam) in GSCs, which is up-regulated in developing cystoblast cells. Loss of function of dpp in the niche results in de-repression of Bam in GSCs, resulting in rapid differentiation of the GSCs. Along with BMP signalling, cap cells also signal other molecules to GSCs: Yb and Piwi. Both of these molecules are required non-autonomously to the GSCs for proliferation-piwi is also required autonomously in the GSCs for proliferation. In the germarium, BMP signaling has a short-range effect, therefore the physical attachment of GSCs to cap cells is important for maintenance and activity.

===== Physical attachment of GSCs to cap cells =====
The GSCs are physically attached to the cap cells by Drosophila E-cadherin (DE-cadherin) adherens junctions and if this physical attachment is lost GSCs will differentiate and lose their identity as a stem cell. The gene encoding DE-cadherin, shotgun (shg), and a gene encoding Beta-catenin ortholog, armadillo, control this physical attachment. A GTPase molecule, rab11, is involved in cell trafficking of DE-cadherins. Knocking out rab11 in GSCs results in detachment of GSCs from the cap cells and premature differentiation of GSCs. Additionally, zero population growth (zpg), encoding a germline-specific gap junction is required for germ cell differentiation.

===== Systemic signals regulating GSCs =====
Both diet and insulin-like signaling directly control GSC proliferation in Drosophila melanogaster. Increasing levels of Drosophila insulin-like peptide (DILP) through diet results in increased GSC proliferation. Up-regulation of DILPs in aged GSCs and their niche results in increased maintenance and proliferation. It has also been shown that DILPs regulate cap cell quantities and regulate the physical attachment of GSCs to cap cells.

===== Renewal mechanisms =====
There are two possible mechanisms for stem cell renewal, symmetrical GSC division or de-differentiation of cystoblasts. Normally, GSCs will divide asymmetrically to produce one daughter cystoblast, but it has been proposed that symmetrical division could result in the two daughter cells remaining GSCs. If GSCs are ablated to create an empty niche and the cap cells are still present and sending maintenance signals, differentiated cystoblasts can be recruited to the niche and de-differentiate into functional GSCs.

==== Stem cell aging ====
As the Drosophila female ages, the stem cell niche undergoes age-dependent loss of GSC presence and activity. These losses are thought to be caused in part by degradation of the important signaling factors from the niche that maintains GSCs and their activity. Progressive decline in GSC activity contributes to the observed reduction in fecundity of Drosophila melanogaster at old age; this decline in GSC activity can be partially attributed to a reduction of signaling pathway activity in the GSC niche. It has been found that there is a reduction in Dpp and Gbb signaling through aging. In addition to a reduction in niche signaling pathway activity, GSCs age cell-autonomously. In addition to studying the decline of signals coming from the niche, GSCs age intrinsically; there is age-dependent reduction of adhesion of GSCs to the cap cells and there is accumulation of reactive oxygen species (ROS) resulting in cellular damage which contributes to GSC aging. There is an observed reduction in the number of cap cells and the physical attachment of GSCs to cap cells through aging. Shg is expressed at significantly lower levels in an old GSC niche in comparison to a young one.

=== GSC niche in Drosophila testes ===
Males of Drosophila melanogaster each have two testes – long, tubular, coiled structures – and at the anterior most tip of each lies the GSC niche. The testis GSC niche is built around a population of non-mitotic hub cells (a.k.a. niche cells), to which two populations of stem cells adhere: the GSCs and the somatic stem cells (SSCs, a.k.a. somatic cyst stem cells/cyst stem cells). Each GSC is enclosed by a pair of SSCs, though each stem cell type is still in contact with the hub cells. In this way, the stem cell niche consists of these three cell types, as not only do the hub cells regulate GSC and SSC behaviour, but the stem cells also regulate the activity of each other. The Drosophila testis GSC niche has proven a valuable model system for examining a wide range of cellular processes and signalling pathways.

==== Outside the testis GSC niche ====
The process of spermatogenesis begins when the GSCs divide asymmetrically, producing a GSC that maintains hub contact, and a gonialblast that exits the niche. The SSCs divide with their GSC partner, and their non-mitotic progeny, the somatic cyst cells (SCCs, a.k.a. cyst cells) will enclose the gonialblast. The gonialblast then undergoes four rounds of synchronous, transit-amplifying divisions with incomplete cytokinesis to produce a sixteen-cell spermatogonial cyst. This spermatogonial cyst then differentiates and grows into a spermatocyte, which will eventually undergo meiosis and produce sperm.

==== Molecular signalling in the testis GSC niche ====
The two main molecular signalling pathways regulating stem cell behaviour in the testis GSC niche are the Jak-STAT and BMP signalling pathways. Jak-STAT signalling originates in the hub cells, where the ligand Upd is secreted to the GSCs and SSCs. This leads to activation of the Drosophila STAT, Stat92E, a transcription factor which effects GSC adhesion to the hub cells, and SSC self-renewal via Zfh-1. Jak-STAT signalling also influences the activation of BMP signalling, via the ligands Dpp and Gbb. These ligands are secreted into the GSCs from the SSCs and hub cells, activate BMP signalling, and suppress the expression of Bam, a differentiation factor. Outside of the niche, gonialblasts no longer receive BMP ligands, and are free to begin their differentiation program. Other important signalling pathways include the MAPK and Hedgehog, which regulate germline enclosure and somatic cell self-renewal, respectively.

=== GSC niche in mouse testes ===
The murine GSC niche in males, also called spermatogonial stem cell (SSC) niche, is located in the basal region of seminiferous tubules in the testes. The seminiferous epithelium is composed of sertoli cells that are in contact with the basement membrane of the tubules, which separates the sertoli cells from the interstitial tissue below. This interstitial tissue comprises Leydig cells, macrophages, mesenchymal cells, capillary networks, and nerves.

During development, primordial germ cells migrate into the seminiferous tubules and downward towards the basement membrane whilst remaining attached to the sertoli cells where they will subsequently differentiate into SSCs, also referred to as Asingle spermatogonia. These SSCs can either self-renew or commit to differentiating into spermatozoa upon the proliferation of Asingle into Apaired spermatogonia. The 2 cells of Apaired spermatogonia remain attached by intercellular bridges and subsequently divide into Aaligned spermatogonia, which is made up of 4–16 connected cells. Aaligned spermatogonia then undergo meiosis I to form spermatocytes and meiosis II to form spermatids which will mature into spermatozoa. This differentiation occurs along the longitudinal axis of sertoli cells, from the basement membrane to the apical lumen of the seminiferous tubules. However, sertoli cells form tight junctions that separate SSCs and spermatogonia in contact with the basement membrane from the spermatocytes and spermatids to create a basal and an adluminal compartment, whereby differentiating spermatocytes must traverse the tight junctions. These tight junctions form the blood testis barrier (BTB) and have been suggested to play a role in isolating differentiated cells in the adluminal compartment from secreted factors by the interstitial tissue and vasculature neighboring the basal compartment.

==== Molecular mechanisms of SSC maintenance and activity ====
===== Physical cues =====
The basement membrane of the seminiferous tubule is a modified form of extracellular matrix composed of fibronectin, collagens, and laminin. β1- integrin is expressed on the surface of SSCs and is involved in their adhesion to the laminin component of the basement membrane although other adhesion molecules are likely also implicated in the attachment of SSCs to the basement membrane. E cadherin expression on SSCs in mice, unlike in Drosophila, have been shown to be dispensable as the transplantation of cultured SSCs lacking E-cadherin are able to colonize host seminiferous tubules and undergo spermatogenesis. In addition the blood testis barrier provides architectural support and is composed of tight junction components such as occludins, claudins and zonula occludens (ZOs) which show dynamic expression during spermatogenesis. For example, claudin 11 has been shown to be a necessary component of these tight junctions as mice lacking this gene have a defective blood testis barrier and do not produce mature spermatozoa.

===== Molecular signals regulating SSC renewal =====
GDNF (Glial cell-derived neurotrophic factor) is known to stimulate self-renewal of SSCs and is secreted by the sertoli cells under the influence of gonadotropin FSH. GDNF is a related member of the TGFβ superfamily of growth factors and when overexpressed in mice, an increase in undifferentiated spermatogonia was observed which led to the formation of germ tumours. In corroboration for its role as a renewal factor, heterozygous knockout male mice for GDNF show decreased spermatogenesis that eventually leads to infertility. In addition the supplementation of GDNF has been shown to extend the expansion of mouse SSCs in culture. However, the GDNF receptor c-RET and co-receptor GFRa1 are not solely expressed on the SSCs but also on Apaired and Aaligned, therefore showing that GDNF is a renewal factor for Asingle to Aaligned in general rather than being specific to the Asingle SSC population. FGF2 (Fibroblast growth factor −2), secreted by sertoli cells, has also been shown to influence the renewal of SSCs and undifferentiated spermatogonia in a similar manner to GDNF.

Although sertoli cells appear to play a major role in renewal, it expresses receptors for testosterone that is secreted by Leydig cells whereas germ cells do not contain this receptor- thus alluding to an important role of Leydig cells upstream in mediating renewal. Leydig cells also produce CSF 1 (Colony stimulating factor −1) for which SSCs strongly express the receptor CSF1R. When CSF 1 was added in culture with GDNF and FGF2 no further increase in proliferation was observed, however, the longer the germ cells remained in culture with CSF-1 the greater the SSC density observed when these germ cells were transplanted into host seminiferous tubules. This showed CSF 1 to be a specific renewal factor that tilts the SSCs towards renewal over differentiation, rather than affecting proliferation of SSCs and spermatogonia. GDNF, FGF 2 and CSF 1 have also been shown to influence self-renewal of stem cells in other mammalian tissues.

Plzf (Promyelocytic leukaemia zinc finger) has also been implicated in regulating SSC self-renewal and is expressed by Asingle, Apaired and Aaligned spermatogonia. Plzf directly inhibits the transcription of a receptor, c-kit, in these early spermatogonia. However, its absence in late spermatogonia permits c-kit expression, which is subsequently activated by its ligand SCF (stem cell factor) secreted by sertoli cells, resulting in further differentiation. Also, the addition of BMP4 and Activin-A have shown to reduce self-renewal of SSCs in culture and increase stem cell differentiation, with BMP4 shown to increase the expression of c-kit.

===== Aging of the SSC niche =====
Prolonged spermatogenesis relies on the maintenance of SSCs, however, this maintenance declines with age and leads to infertility. Mice between 12 and 14 months of age show decreased testis weight, reduced spermatogenesis and SSC content. Although stem cells are regarded as having the potential to infinitely replicate in vitro, factors provided by the niche are crucial in vivo. Indeed, serial transplantation of SSCs from male mice of different ages into young mice 3 months of age, whose endogenous spermatogenesis had been ablated, was used to estimate stem cell content given that each stem cell would generate a colony of spermatogenesis. The results of this experiment showed that transplanted SSCs could be maintained far longer than their replicative lifespan for their age. In addition, a study also showed that SSCs from young fertile mice could not be maintained nor undergo spermatogenesis when transplanted into testes of old, infertile mice. Together, these results points towards a deterioration of the SSC niche itself with aging rather than the loss of intrinsic factors in the SSC.

=== Vertebrate adult stem cell niches ===
==== Hematopoietic stem cell niche ====
Vertebrate hematopoietic stem cells niche in the bone marrow is formed by cells subendosteal osteoblasts, sinusoidal endothelial cells and bone marrow stromal (also sometimes called reticular) cells which includes a mix of fibroblastoid, monocytic and adipocytic cells (which comprise marrow adipose tissue).

==== Hair follicle stem cell niche ====
The hair follicle stem cell niche is one of the more closely studied niches thanks to its relative accessibility and role in important diseases such as melanoma. The bulge area at the junction of arrector pili muscle to the hair follicle sheath has been shown to host the skin stem cells which can contribute to all epithelial skin layers. There cells are maintained by signaling in concert with niche cells – signals include paracrine (e.g. sonic hedgehog), autocrine and juxtacrine signals. The bulge region of the hair follicle relies on these signals to maintain the stemness of the cells. Fate mapping or cell lineage tracing has shown that Keratin 15 positive stem cells' progeny participate in all epithelial lineages. The follicle undergoes cyclic regeneration in which these stem cells migrate to various regions and differentiate into the appropriate epithelial cell type. Some important signals in the hair follicle stem cell niche produced by the mesenchymal dermal papilla or the bulge include BMP, TGF-β and Fibroblast growth factor (FGF) ligands and Wnt inhibitors. While, Wnt signaling pathways and β-catenin are important for stem cell maintenance, over-expression of β-catenin in hair follicles induces improper hair growth. Therefore, these signals such as Wnt inhibitors produced by surrounding cells are important to maintain and facilitate the stem cell niche.

==== Intestinal stem cell niche ====
Intestinal organoids have been used to study intestinal stem cell niches. An intestinal organoid culture can be used to indirectly assess the effect of the manipulation on the stem cells through assessing the organoid's survival and growth. Research using intestinal organoids have demonstrated that the survival of intestinal stem cells is improved by the presence of neurons and fibroblasts, and through the administration of IL-22.

==== Cardiovascular stem cell niche ====
Cardiovascular stem cell niches can be found within the right ventricular free wall, atria and outflow tracks of the heart. They are composed of Isl1+/Flk1+ cardiac progenitor cells (CPCs) that are localized into discrete clusters within a ColIV and laminin extracellular matrix (ECM). ColI and fibronectin are predominantly found outside the CPC clusters within the myocardium. Immunohistochemical staining has been used to demonstrate that differentiating CPCs, which migrate away from the progenitor clusters and into the ColI and fibronectin ECM surrounding the niche, down-regulate Isl1 while up-regulating mature cardiac markers such as troponin C. There is a current controversy over the role of Isl1+ cells in the cardiovascular system. While major publications have identified these cells as CPC's and have found a very large number in the murine and human heart, recent publications have found very few Isl1+ cells in the murine fetal heart and attribute their localization to the sinoatrial node, which is known as an area that contributes to heart pacemaking. The role of these cells and their niche are under intense research and debate.

==== Neural stem cell niche ====
Neural stem cell niches are divided in two : the Subependymal zone (SEZ) and the Subgranular zone (SGZ).

The SEZ is a thin area beneath the ependymal cell layer that contains three types of neural stem cells : infrequently dividing neural stem cells (NSCs), rapidly dividing transit amplifying precursors (TaPs) and neuroblasts (NBs). The SEZ extracellular matrix (ECM) has significant differences in composition compared to surrounding tissues. Recently, it was described that progenitor cells, NSCs, TaPs and NBs were attached to ECM structures called Fractones. These structures are rich in laminin, collagen and heparan sulfate proteoglycans. Other ECM molecules, such as tenascin-C, MMPs and different proteoglycans are also implicated in the neural stem cell niche.

== Cancer stem cell niche ==
Cancer tissue is morphologically heterogenous, not only due to the variety of cell types present, endothelial, fibroblast and various immune cells, but cancer cells themselves are not a homogenous population either.

In accordance with the hierarchy model of tumours, the cancer stem cells (CSC) are maintained by biochemical and physical contextual signals emanating from the microenvironment, called the cancer stem cell niche. The CSC niche is very similar to normal stem cells niche (embryonic stem cell (ESC), Adult Stem Cell ASC) in function (maintaining of self-renewal, undifferentiated state and ability to differentiate) and in signalling pathways (Activin/Noda, Akt/PTEN, JAK/STAT, PI3-K, TGF-β, Wnt and BMP). It is hypothesized that CSCs arise form aberrant signalling of the microenvironment and participates not only in providing survival signals to CSCs but also in metastasis by induction of epithelial-mesenchymal transition (EMT).

=== Hypoxia ===
Hypoxic condition in stem cell niches (ESC, ASC or CSC) is necessary for maintaining stem cells in an undifferentiated state and also for minimizing DNA damage via oxidation. The maintaining of the hypoxic state is under control of Hypoxia-Inducible transcription Factors (HIFs). HIFs contribute to tumour progression, cell survival and metastasis by regulation of target genes as VEGF, GLUT-1, ADAM-1, Oct4 and Notch.

==== Hypoxia in the CSC niche ====
Hypoxia plays an important role in the regulation of cancer stem cell niches and EMT through the promotion of HIFs. These HIFs help maintain cancer stem cell niches by regulating important stemness genes such as Oct4, Nanog, SOX2, Klf4, and cMyc. HIFs also regulate important tumor suppressor genes such as p53 and genes that promote metastasis. Although HIFs increase the survival of cells by decreasing the effects of oxidative stress, they have also been shown to decrease factors such as RAD51 and H2AX that maintain genomic stability. In the hypoxic condition there is an increase of intracellular Reactive Oxygen Species (ROS) which also promote CSCs survival via stress response. ROS stabilizes HIF-1α which promotes the Met proto-oncogene, which drives metastasis or motogenic escape in melanoma cells. All of these factors contribute to a cancer stem cell phenotype which is why it is often referred to as a hypoxic stem cell niche. Hypoxic environments are often found in tumors where the cells are dividing faster that angiogenesis can occur. It is important to study hypoxia as an aspect of cancer because hypoxic environments have been shown to be resistant to radiation therapy. Radiation has been shown to increase the amounts of HIF-1. EMT induction by hypoxia though interactions between HIF-1α and ROS is crucial for metastasis in cancers such as melanoma. It has been found that many genes associated with melanoma are regulated by hypoxia such as MXI1, FN1, and NME1.

=== Epithelial–mesenchymal transition ===
Epithelial–mesenchymal transition is a morphogenetic process, normally occurs in embryogenesis that is "hijacked" by cancer stem cells by detaching from their primary place and migrating to another one. The dissemination is followed by reverse transition so-called Epithelial-Mesenchymal Transition (EMT). This process is regulated by CSCs microenvironment via the same signalling pathways as in embryogenesis using the growth factors (TGF-β, PDGF, EGF), cytokine IL-8 and extracellular matrix components. These growth factors' interactions through intracellular signal transducers like β-catenin has been shown to induce metastatic potential. A characteristic of EMT is loss of the epithelial markers (E-cadherin, cytokeratins, claudin, occluding, desmoglein, desmocolin) and gain of mesenchymal markers (N-cadherin, vimentin, fibronectin).

There is also certain degree of similarity in homing-mobilization of normal stem cells and metastasis-invasion of cancer stem cells. There is an important role of Matrix MetalloProteinases (MMP), the principal extracellular matrix degrading enzymes, thus for example matrix metalloproteinase-2 and −9 are induced to expression and secretion by stromal cells during metastasis of colon cancer via direct contact or paracrine regulation. The next sharing molecule is Stromal cell-Derived Factor-1 (SDF-1).

=== Inflammation ===
The EMT and cancer progression can be triggered also by chronic inflammation. The main roles have molecules (IL-6, IL-8, TNF-α, NFκB, TGF-β, HIF-1α) which can regulate both processes through regulation of downstream signalling that overlapping between EMT and inflammation. The downstream pathways involving in regulation of CSCs are Wnt, SHH, Notch, TGF-β, RTKs-EGF, FGF, IGF, HGF.

NFκB regulates the EMT, migration and invasion of CSCs through Slug, Snail and Twist. The activation of NFκB leads to increase not only in production of IL-6, TNF-α and SDF-1 but also in delivery of growth factors.

The source of the cytokine production are lymphocytes (TNF-α), Mesenchymal Stem Cells (SDF-1, IL-6, IL8).

Interleukin 6 mediates activation of STAT3. The high level of STAT3 was described in isolated CSCs from liver, bone, cervical and brain cancer. The inhibition of STAT3 results in dramatic reduction in their formation. Generally IL-6 contributes a survival advantage to local stem cells and thus facilitates tumorigenesis.

SDF-1α secreted from Mesenchymal Stem Cells (MSCs) has important role in homing and maintenance of Hematopoietic Stem Cell (HSC) in bone marrow niche but also in homing and dissemination of CSC.

=== Angiogenesis ===
Hypoxia is a main stimulant for angiogenesis, with HIF-1α being the primary mediator. Angiogenesis induced by hypoxic conditions is called an "Angiogenic switch". HIF-1 promotes expression of several angiogenic factors: Vascular Endothelial Growth Factor (VEGF), basic Fibroblast Growth Factor (bFGF), Placenta-Like Growth Factor (PLGF), Platelet-Derived Growth Factor (PDGF) and Epidermal Growth Factor. But there is evidence that the expression of angiogenic agens by cancer cells can also be HIF-1 independent. It seems that there is an important role of Ras protein, and that intracellular levels of calcium regulate the expression of angiogenic genes in response to hypoxia.

The angiogenic switch downregulates angiogenesis suppressor proteins, such as thrombospondin, angiostatin, endostatin and tumstatin. Angiogenesis is necessary for the primary tumour growth.

=== Injury-induced ===
During injury, support cells are able to activate a program for repair, recapitulating aspects of development in the area of damage. These areas become permissive for stem cell renewal, migration and differentiation. For instance in the CNS, injury is able to activate a developmental program in astrocytes that allow them to express molecules that support stem cells such as chemokines i.e. SDF-1 and morphogens such as sonic hedgehog.

== Extracellular Matrix Mimicking Strategies For Stem Cell Niche ==
It is evident that biophysio-chemical characteristics of ECM such as composition, shape, topography, stiffness, and mechanical strength can control the stem cell behavior. These ECM factors are equally important when stem cells are grown in vitro. Given a choice between niche cell-stem cell interaction and ECM-stem cell interaction, mimicking ECM is preferred as that can be precisely controlled by scaffold fabrication techniques, processing parameters or post-fabrication modifications. In order to mimic, it is essential to understand natural properties of ECM and their role in stem cell fate processes. Various studies involving different types of scaffolds that regulate stem cells fate by mimicking these ECM properties have been done.)
