= Osteochondroprogenitor cell =

Bone- or cartilage-forming cells

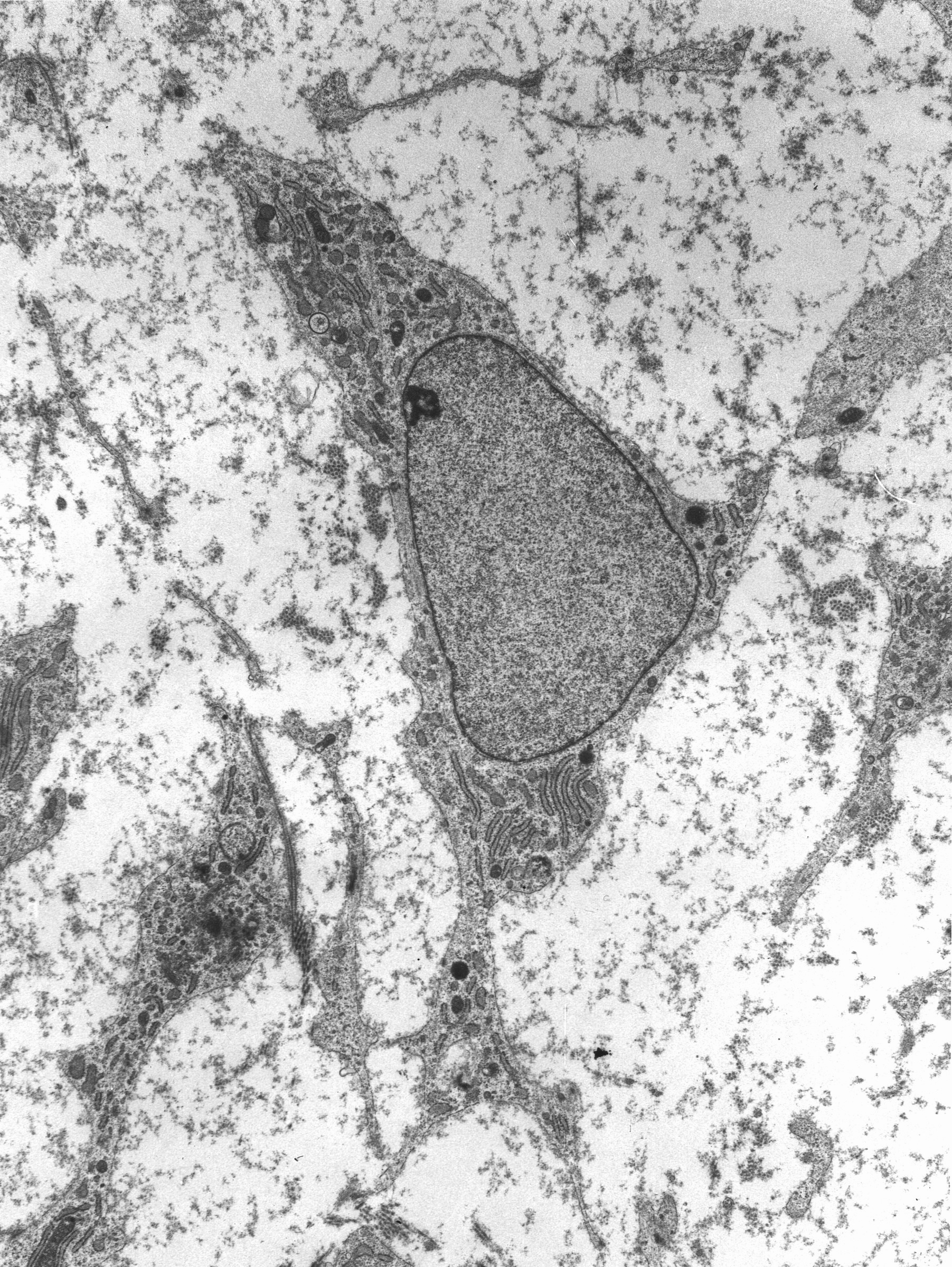
Transmission electron micrograph of a mesenchymal stem cell displaying typical ultrastructural characteristics.

Osteochondroprogenitor cells are progenitor cells that arise from mesenchymal stem cells (MSC) in the bone marrow. They have the ability to differentiate into osteoblasts or chondrocytes depending on the signalling molecules they are exposed to, giving rise to either bone or cartilage respectively. Osteochondroprogenitor cells are important for bone formation and maintenance.

== Discovery ==
Alexander Friedenstein and his colleagues first identified osteoprogenitor cells in multiple mammalian tissues, before any genetic or morphological criteria were put in place for bone marrow or connective tissues. Osteoprogenitor cells can be identified by their associations with existing bone or cartilage structures, or their placement in the embryo, as the sites for osteogenesis and chondrogenesis are now known.

== Cell signalling and differentiation ==
Osteochondroprogenitor can be found between MSCs and the terminally differentiated osteoblasts and chondrocytes. Via different signalling molecules and combinations the osteochondroprogenitor will differentiate into either osteoblasts or chondrocytes.

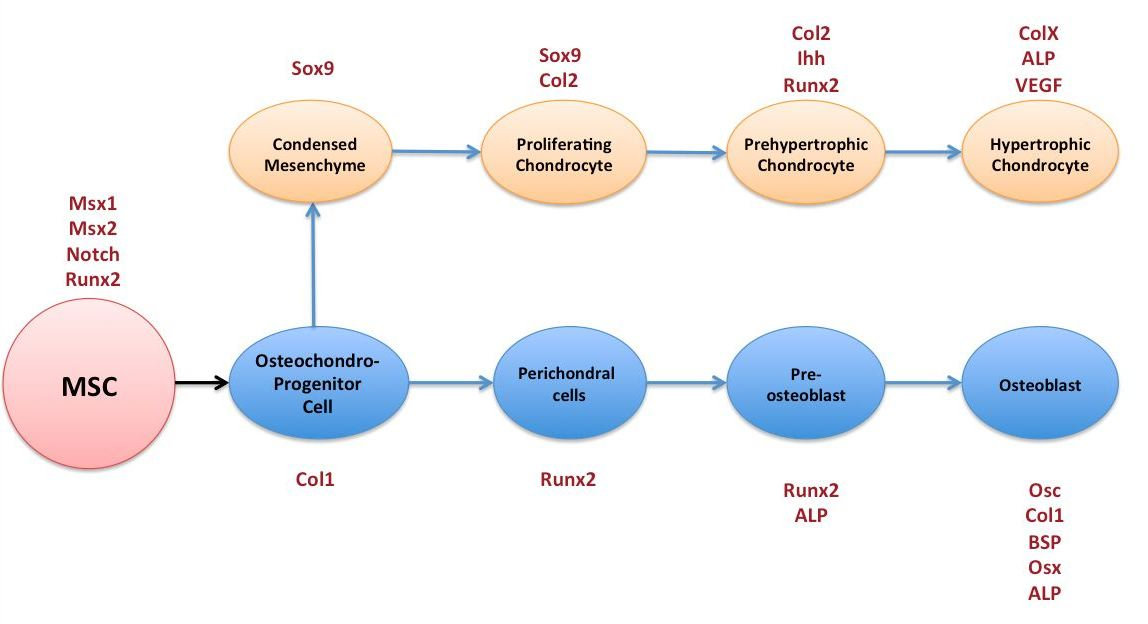
Simplified diagram of MSCs, and their differentiation pathways into osteoblast and chodrocytic cell lineages. Data based on a 10.5-day-old mouse embryo. Included are the multiple factors for differentiation.

=== Differentiation into chondrocytes ===
Chondrocytes are only present in cartilage where they will produce cartilaginous matrix to maintain the structure. Sox9, L-Sox5 and Sox6 are needed for the osteochondroprogenitor to undergo chondrocytic differentiation. The transcription factor Sox9 can be found in multiple sites in the body (pancreas, central nervous system, intestines) and it is also found in all chondrocyte progenitor cells, suggesting that they are important in chondrogenesis.

=== Differentiation into osteoblasts ===
Osteoblasts are cells that group together to form units, called osteons, to produce bone. Runx2 (which may also be known as Cbfa1), and Osx (a zinc finger containing transcription factor) are necessary for osteochondroprogenitor cells to differentiate into the osteoblast cell lineage. These factors also have a role in hypertrophic chondrocyte maturation.

=== B-catenin ===
β-catenin of the canonical Wnt signalling pathway plays a role in cell fate determination, as it is critical for osteoblastogenesis, and the differentiation of chondrocytes into osteoblasts. Knock out of the entire pathway results in early embryonic death, therefore most research of this nature utilised conditional knockouts of the pathway.

=== TGF-β ===
During mandible development, most of it is formed through intramembranous ossification, where endochondral ossification will occur in the proximal region. TGF-β is important for cell proliferation and differentiation during skeletogenesis. During this process, TGF-β can stimulate differentiation into either chondrocytes or osteoblasts via FGF, Msx1, and Ctgf signalling pathways. General gene knock out of the TGF-β resulted in death. Conditional inactivation of TGF-βr2 of osteochondroprogenitor cells in the cranial neural crest resulted in faster osteoprogenitor differentiation and disorganised chondrogenesis.

TGF-β determines and regulates cell lineages during endochondral ossification through Sox9 and Runx2 signalling pathways. TGF-β will act as a stimulator of chondrogenesis, and an inhibitor of osteoblastic differentiation, by blocking the Runx2 factor through Smad3 activation. Sox9 stimulates differentiation into chondrocytes. Sox9 blocked osteochondroprogenitor cells were found to express osteoblast marker genes, reprogramming the cells into the osteoblastic lineage.

Loss of TGF-β signalling will lead to reduced Sox9 activity, but not prevent it completely, suggesting that there must be other factors and signalling pathways regulating Sox9 activity. Once Sox9 activity is lost, differentiation into the osteoblastic lineage dominates.

== Embryonic development ==
It is thought that through a combination of biochemical and biophysical stimuli, the uncommitted stem cells of the embryo will undergo differentiation into certain cell lineages. However the exact mechanism and signalling pathways are still unclear. Studies have shown that embryonic stem cells are more mechanosensitive than their differentiated counterparts. During embryonic development mesenchymal cells will form cellular structures known as 'condensations.' These cellular units will then develop into skeletal and other tissues, such as cartilage, tendon, ligament and muscle tissue.

Osteoprogenitor cell condensations can aggregate, dissipate or condense depending on the signals present, however these still remain largely unknown. Depending on the different effects, the cellular condensations may differentiate into osteogenic or chondrocytic condensations.

The positioning of the osteoprogenitor cell condensations determines the cell lineage before the signalling molecules can. This is due to their positions relative to any epithelial surfaces. Osteoblastic and chondrogenic condensations differ in their biophysical parameters within the embryo. Their distance in relation to the nearest epithelial surface will determine the cell lineage. For example, osteoblastic condensations are closer to epithelial surfaces so they will be exposed to more biophysical and biochemical stimuli due to the proximity and increased cell-epithelial interactions.

== Aging ==
The regeneration potential of skeletal progenitor cells declines with age. This reduction of regeneration potential is associated with increased risk of bone fractures with age. Central to reduction of regeneration potential are the skeletal stem progenitor cells since they are responsible for the growth, regeneration and repair of bone tissue. With increasing age the functionality of adult stem cells declines as DNA damages and mutations accumulate.

== Consequence of defects in osteochondroprogenitor cells ==
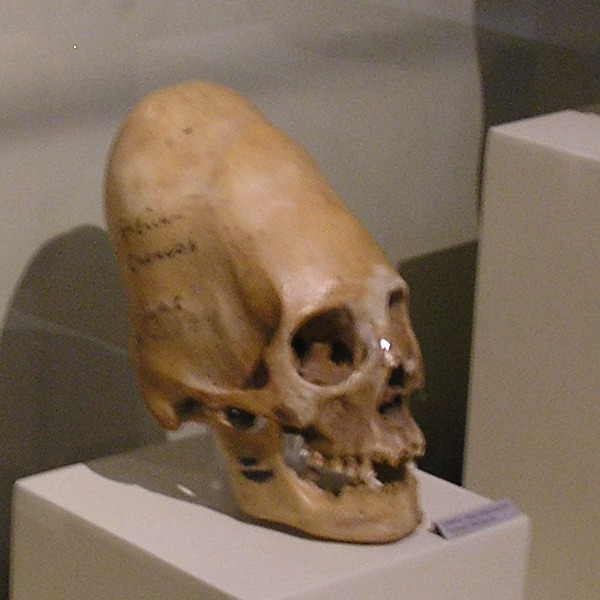
Example of bone deformation

Deletion of the Trsp gene in osteochondroprogenitor cells results in abnormal bone growth, delayed ossification, chondronecrosis and dwarfism. General Trsp gene deletion is lethal to the embryo. The results of this research was used as a model for Kashin-Beck disease. Kashin-Beck is a result of combinatorial environmentally induced by factors such as: toxic mould, contaminated grains by mycotoxins, and mostly by selenium deficiency, which is necessary for selenoprotein function. The disease has symptoms similar to those resulting from Trsp gene knockout.

Loss of the regulator, Pten, of the Phophatidylinositol3' kinase pathway results in skeletal overgrowth and growth plate dysfunction, due to overproduction of the matrix and accelerated hypertrophic differentiation.

== See also ==
- List of human cell types derived from the germ layers
