= Bone marrow adipose tissue =

Biological tissue housed in bone

- Bone marrow adipocytes are derived from mesenchymal stem cell (MSC) differentiation.

Details
- System: Musculoskeletal

Identifiers
- Latin: adipose ossium medulla

Bone marrow adipose tissue (BMAT), also referred to as marrow adipose tissue (MAT), is a type of adipose tissue (fat deposit) found within the bone marrow. BMAT increases in conditions associated with low bone density, such as osteoporosis, anorexia nervosa and caloric restriction, and skeletal weightlessness such as that occurring during spaceflight. It has also been linked to certain anti-diabetic therapies.

Conversely, BMAT decreases in conditions such as anaemia, leukaemia, and hypertensive heart failure; in response to hormones including oestrogen, leptin, and growth hormone; with exercise-induced weight loss or bariatric surgery; following chronic cold exposure; and after treatment with pharmacological agents such as bisphosphonates, teriparatide, and metformin.

== Anatomy ==
Bone marrow adipocytes (BMAds) originate from mesenchymal stem cell (MSC) progenitors that also give rise to osteoblasts, among other cell types. Thus, it is thought that BMAT results from preferential MSC differentiation into the adipocyte, rather than osteoblast, lineage in the setting of osteoporosis. Since BMAT is increased in the setting of obesity and is suppressed by endurance exercise, or vibration, it is likely that BMAT physiology, in the setting of mechanical input/exercise, approximates that of white adipose tissue (WAT).

== Physiology ==
=== Exercise regulation ===
The first study to demonstrate exercise regulation of BMAT in rodents was published in 2014; Now, exercise regulation of BMAT has been confirmed in a human, adding clinical importance. Several studies demonstrated exercise reduction of BMAT which occurs along with an increase in bone quantity. Since exercise increases bone quantity, reduces BMAT and increases expression of markers of fatty acid oxidation in bone, BMAT is thought to be providing needed fuel for exercise-induced bone formation or anabolism. A notable exception occurs in the setting of caloric restriction: exercise suppression of BMAT does not yield an increase in bone formation and even appears to cause bone loss. Indeed, energy availability appears to be a factor in the ability of exercise to regulate BMAT. Another exception occurs in lipodystrophy, a condition with reduced overall adipose stores: exercise- induced anabolism is possible, even with minimal BMAT stores.

=== Relationships to other types of fat ===
BMAT has been reported to have qualities of both white and brown fat. However, more-recent functional and -omics studies have shown that BMAT is a unique adipose depot that is molecularly and functionally distinct to WAT or BAT. Subcutaneous white fat contain excess energy, indicating a clear evolutionary advantage during times of scarcity. WAT is also the source of adipokines and inflammatory markers which have both positive (e.g., adiponectin) and negative effects on metabolic and cardiovascular endpoints. Visceral abdominal fat (VAT) is a distinct type of WAT that is "proportionally associated with negative metabolic and cardiovascular morbidity", regenerates cortisol, and recently has been tied to decreased bone formation Both types of WAT substantially differ from brown adipose tissue (BAT) as by a group of proteins that help BAT's thermogenic role. BMAT, by its "specific marrow location, and its adipocyte origin from at least LepR+ marrow MSC is separated from non-bone fat storage by larger expression of bone transcription factors", and likely indicates a different fat phenotype. Recently, BMAT was noted to "produce a greater proportion of adiponectin – an adipokine associated with improved metabolism – than WAT", suggesting an endocrine function for this depot, akin, but different, from that of WAT.

=== Impact on bone health ===
BMAT increases in states of bone fragility. BMAT is thought to result from preferential MSC differentiation into an adipocyte, rather than osteoblast lineage in osteoporosis based on the inverse relationship between bone and BMAT in bone-fragile osteoporotic states. An increase in BMAT is noted in osteoporosis clinical studies measured by MR spectroscopy. Estrogen therapy in postmenopausal osteoporosis reduces BMAT. Antiresorptive therapies like risedronate or zoledronate also decrease BMAT while increasing bone density, supporting an inverse relationship between bone quantity and BMAT. During aging, bone quantity declines and fat redistributes from subcutaneous to ectopic sites such as bone marrow, muscle, and liver. Aging is associated with lower osteogenic and greater adipogenic biasing of MSC. This aging-related biasing of MSC away from osteoblast lineage may represent higher basal PPARγ expression or decreased Wnt10b. Thus, bone fragility, osteoporosis, and osteoporotic fractures are thought to be linked to mechanisms which promote BMAT accumulation.

=== Maintenance of hematopoietic stem cells ===
BMAds secrete factors that promote HSC renewal in most bones.

Hematopoietic cells (also known as blood cells) reside in the bone marrow along with BMAds. These hematopoietic cells are derived from hematopoietic stem cells (HSC) which give rise to diverse cells: cells of the blood, immune system, as well as cells that break down bone (osteoclasts). HSC renewal occurs in the marrow stem cell niche, a microenvironment that contains cells and secreted factors that promote appropriate renewal and differentiation of HSC. The study of the stem cell niche is relevant to the field of oncology in order to improve therapy for multiple hematologic cancers. As such cancers are often treated with bone marrow transplantation, there is interest in improving the renewal of HSC.

== Measurement ==
In order to understand the physiology of BMAT, various analytic methods have been applied. BMAds are difficult to isolate and quantify because they are interspersed with bony and hematopoietic elements. Until recently, qualitative measurements of BMAT have relied on bone histology, which is subject to site selection bias and cannot adequately quantify the volume of fat in the marrow. Nevertheless, histological techniques and fixation make possible visualization of BMAT, quantification of BMAd size, and BMAT's association with the surrounding endosteum, milieu of cells, and secreted factors.

Recent advances in cell surface and intracellular marker identification and single-cell analyses led to greater resolution and high-throughput ex-vivo quantification. Flow cytometric quantification can be used to purify adipocytes from the stromal vascular fraction of most fat depots. Early research with such machinery cited adipocytes as too large and fragile for cytometer-based purification, rendering them susceptible to lysis; however, recent advances have been made to mitigate this; nevertheless, this methodology continues to pose technical challenges and is inaccessible to much of the research community.

To improve quantification of BMAT, novel imaging techniques have been developed as a means to visualize and quantify BMAT. Although proton magnetic resonance spectroscopy (1H-MRS) has been used with success to quantify vertebral BMAT in humans, it is difficult to employ in laboratory animals. Magnetic resonance imaging (MRI) provides BMAT assessment in the vertebral skeleton in conjunction with μCT-based marrow density measurements. A volumetric method to identify, quantify, and localize BMAT in rodent bone has been recently developed, requiring osmium staining of bones and μCT imaging, followed by advanced image analysis of osmium-bound lipid volume (in mm^{3}) relative to bone volume. This technique provides reproducible quantification and visualization of BMAT, enabling the ability to consistently quantify changes in BMAT with diet, exercise, and agents that constrain precursor lineage allocation. Although the osmium method is quantitatively precise, osmium is toxic and cannot be compared across batched experiments. Recently, researchers developed and validated a 9.4T MRI scanner technique that allows localization and volumetric (3D) quantification that can be compared across experiments, as in.

Several studies have also analysed BMAT function in vivo using positron emission tomography - computed tomography (PET-CT) combined with the tracer 18F-Fluorodeoxyglucose (FDG). This allows glucose uptake, a measure of metabolic activity, to be quantified in living organisms, including humans. Two recent studies found that, unlike brown adipose tissue, BMAT does not increase glucose uptake in response to cold exposure, demonstrating that BMAT is functionally distinct from BAT. The full extent of BMAT's impact on systemic metabolic homeostasis remains to be determined.

<big&amp;amp;gt;Methods for Quantification of Bone Marrow Adipose Tissue (BMAT)</big&amp;amp;gt;

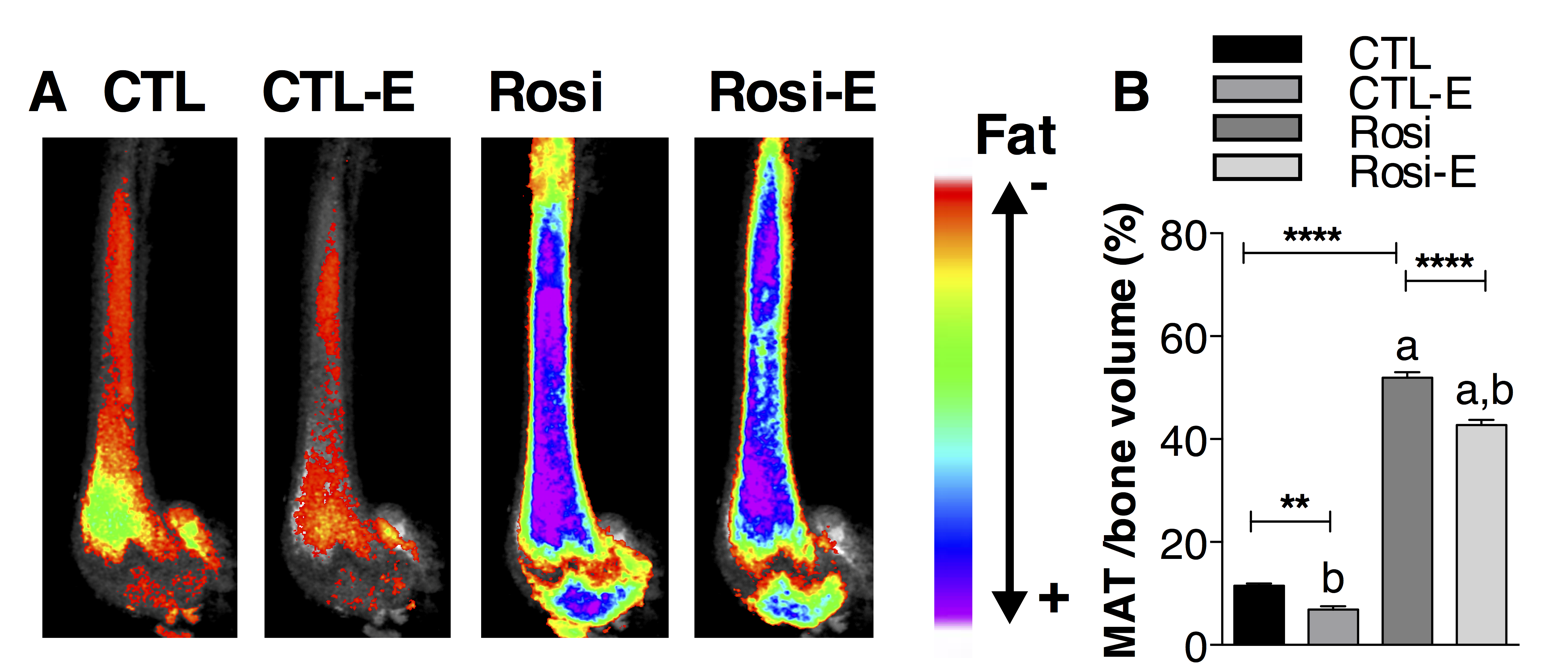
This figure demonstrates the use of the osmium- μCT method with advanced image processing to quantify BMAT. In this figure, running exercise is shown to suppress BMAT despite PPARγ agonist. Fat binder osmium is imaged via μCT (A ) in n =5 per group overlaid images. Quantification of osmium as BMAT/ bone volume in the whole femur is shown. a, significant due to Rosi. b, significant due to exercise. Rosi=rosiglizaone, CTL=control, E=exercise.

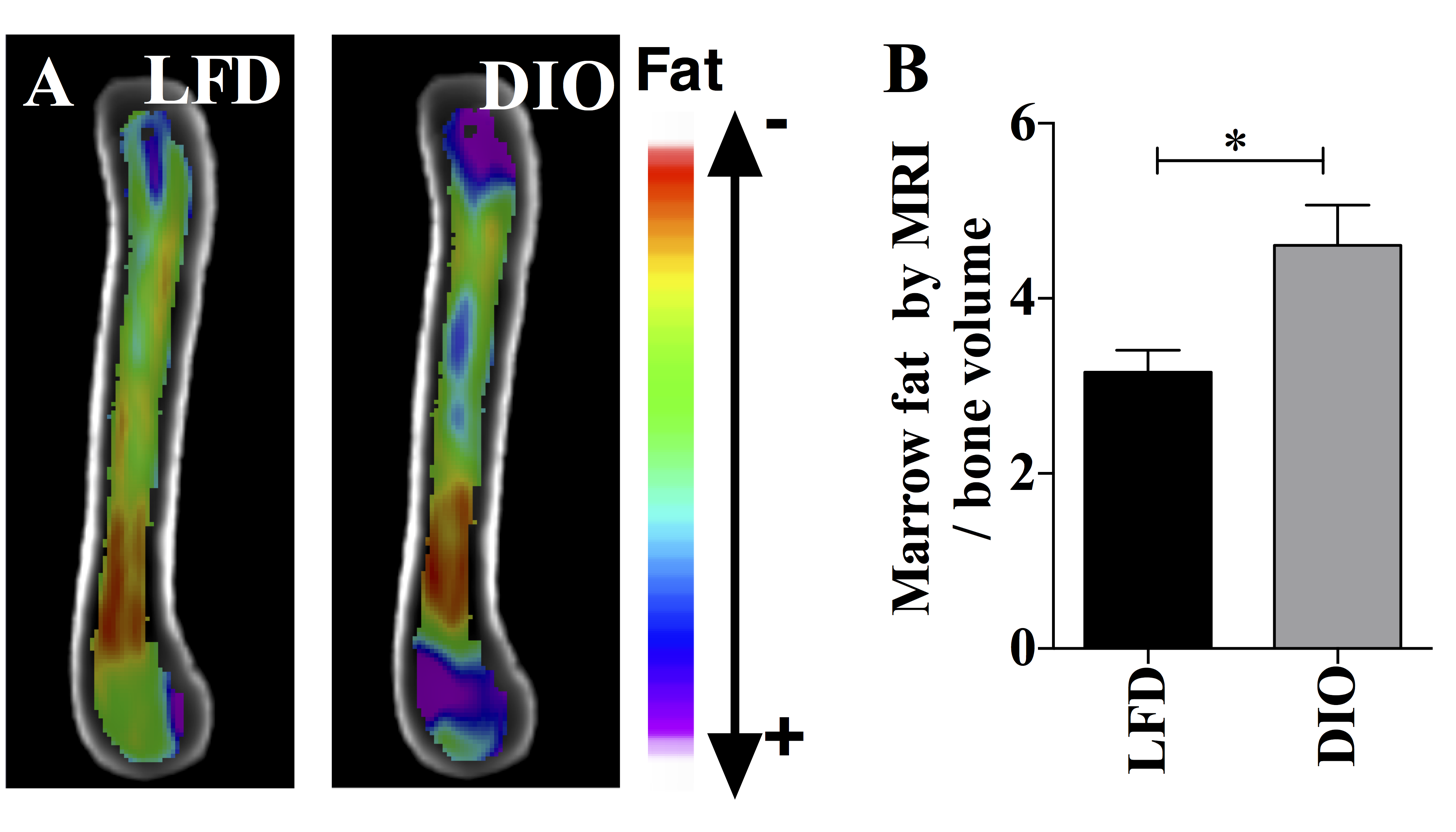
This figure demonstrates the use of MRI imaging (9.4T scanner) along with advanced image processing to quantify BMAT. The images and graph demonstrate that BMAT is higher in obese compared with lean mice. B6 mice were fed HFD from age 4 wk until age 16 wk. BMAT was quantified by MRI. A) n=10 superimposed group average images are shown B) BMAT normalized to bone volume in each group.

Representative distal femur histologic section of a 16-week-old healthy C57BL/6 mouse demonstrating a typical quantity of marrow adipocytes.

Representative distal femur histologic section of a 16-week-old C57BL/6 mouse after 6 weeks of calorie restriction demonstrating an increased quantity of marrow adipocytes.

== Scientific societies ==
=== The International Bone Marrow Adiposity Society (BMAS) ===
Because of the increasing interest in BMAT from both researchers and clinicians, in 2018 The International Bone Marrow Adiposity Society (BMAS) was founded. Work to build the society began in Lille, France in 2015, when the first International Meeting on Bone Marrow Adiposity (BMA2015) was held. The meeting was a great success and led to a second international meeting (BMA2016) in August 2016 held in Rotterdam, The Netherlands. Both meetings were a success in that they for the first time brought together scientists and physicians from different backgrounds (bone metabolism, cancer, obesity and diabetes) to share ideas and advance research into, and our understanding of, the patho/physiological role of BMAds.

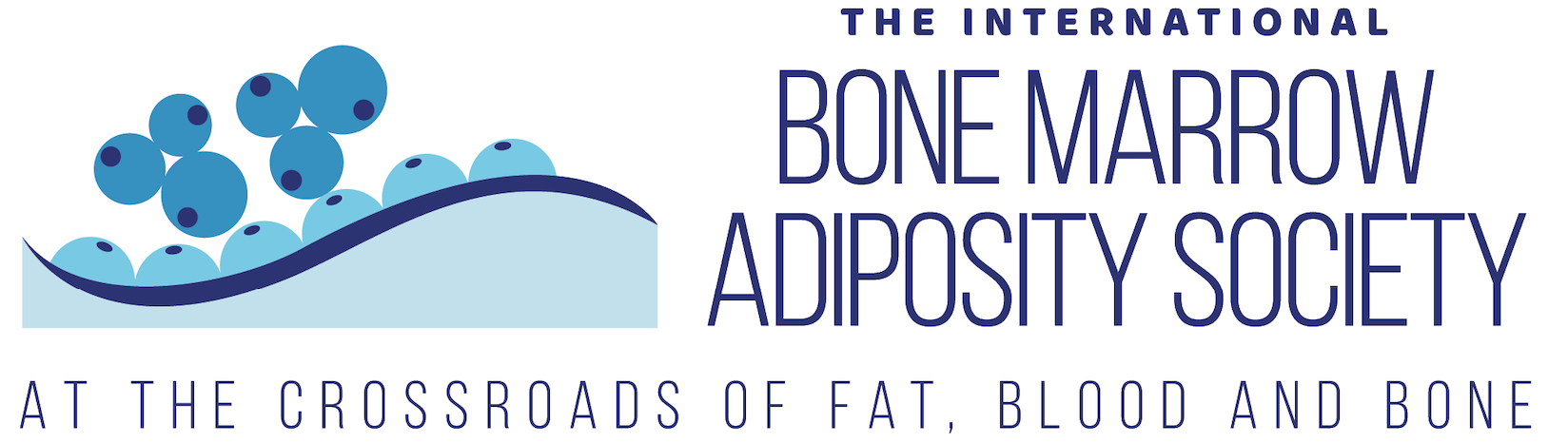
Logo for The International Bone Marrow Adiposity Society

This success led to a network of researchers discussing the formation of a new society, focusing on bone marrow adiposity (BMA). This network worked together in 2016–2017 to lay the foundations for this society, which was then discussed further during the third international meeting held in Lausanne, Switzerland in 2017 (BMA2017). The statues were then signed at the fourth international meeting, held in 2018 again in Lille (BMA2018). As discussed in the following section, there have since been three further international meetings, held in Odense, Denmark in 2019 (BMA2019), virtually in 2020 (BMA2020), and in Athens, Greece in 2022 (BMA2022). The first BMAS Summer School was held virtually in the summer of 2021.

Since its foundation, BMAS working groups have published three position papers relating to nomenclature, methodologies and biobanking for BMA research. These working groups remain active, with other working groups also focussing on clinical and translational issues, public engagement, and young researchers (Next Generation BMAS)

==== BMAS meetings ====
- BMA2015 (Lille, France)
- BMA2016 (Rotterdam, Netherlands)
- BMA2017 (Lausanne, Switzerland)
- BMA2018 (Lille, France)
- BMA2019 (Odense, Denmark)
- BMA2020 (virtual BMA meeting)
- BMA Summer School 2021 (virtual)
- BMA2022 (Athens, Greece)

=== American Society for Bone and Mineral Research ===
ASBMR has published hundreds of presentations and articles on BMAT featured in the ASBMR annual meetings, The Journal of Bone and Mineral Research ( JBMR), JBMRPlus, and the Primer on the Metabolic Bone Diseases and Disorders of Mineral Metabolism.

=== Endocrine Society ===
Endocrine society features many presentations and articles on BMAT.
