= Myelonecrosis =

Myelonecrosis is a degenerative change to bone marrow caused primarily by loss of circulation to the bone tissue (ischaemia).

These changes can be caused by toxic insult, thrombosis, neoplasia or DIC (disseminated intravascular coagulation).
