= Fusome =

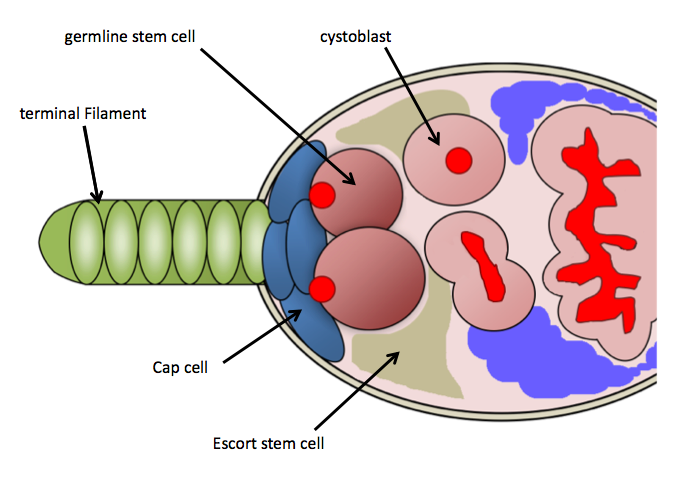
Drosophila ovariole: spectrosomes are the red round structures in germline stem cells. The red branched structures in 2-cell and 8-cell cysts are the fusomes.

The fusome is a membranous structure found in the developing germ cell cysts of many insect orders. Initial description of the fusome occurred in the 19th century and since then the fusome has been extensively studied in Drosophila melanogaster male and female germline development. This structure has roles in maintaining germline cysts, coordinating the number of mitotic divisions prior to meiosis, and oocyte determination by serving as a structure for intercellular communication.

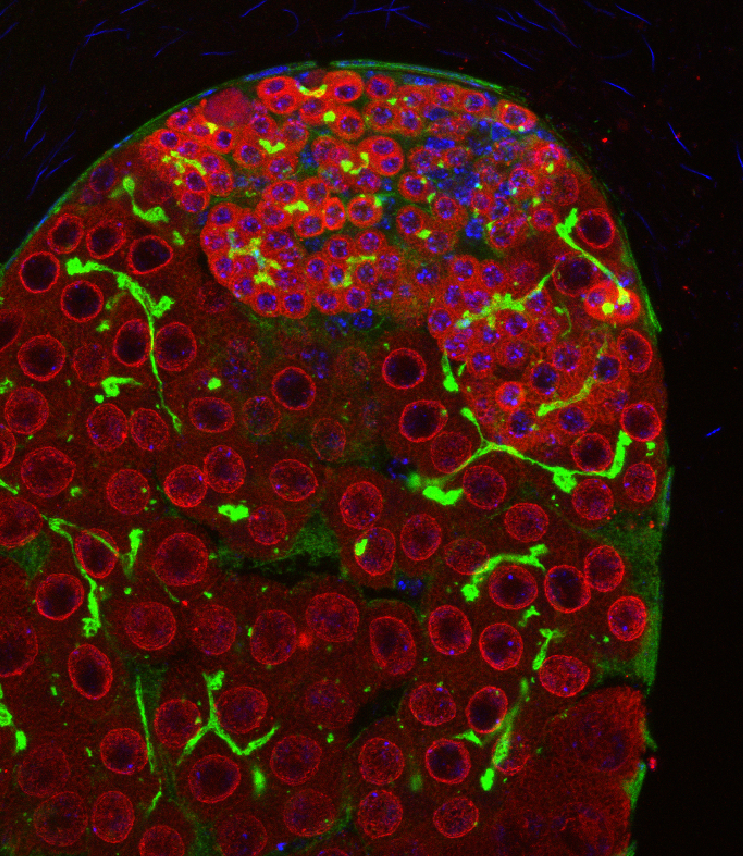
A wild type D. melanogaster testis showing the fusome (spectrin, green), DNA (DAPI, blue), and germ cells (vasa, red). The fusome connects cells in a cyst and becomes branched as the cyst grows with cell divisions. Image by S. Brantley, used with permission by the author.

== Structure ==
In D. melanogaster, germline cysts form from four mitotic divisions with incomplete cytokinesis that originated from one germline stem cell. Incomplete cytokinesis results in intercellular bridges connecting every cell in the cyst, called ring canals^{3}. The four mitotic divisions result in cysts of 16 cells connected by 15 ring canals. The fusome is composed of membrane vesicles and originates from endoplasmic reticulum. Fusome material is inside ring canals and can range in size from 1 to 10 um, depending on the stage of development.

1.1 Fusome Development

The spectrosome is a round structure in germline stem cells that develops into the fusome in cyst cells. Fusome divides asymmetrically into daughter cells in females by attaching to one spindle pole during meiosis, resulting in one cell receiving all fusome material. Fusome is generated de novo in the ring canal connecting the two cells. The two fusome parts then fuse together to connect the cells. Asymmetric fusome partitioning and new formation followed by fusion occurs at each mitotic division. In spermatogenesis, the fusome partitioning is symmetric and the fusome is still present during the meiotic divisions.

1.2 Fusome components

Many proteins and organelles associate with the fusome throughout germ cell development. Cytoskeleton components, such as alpha and beta spectrins, hu-li tai shao (hts), and ankyrin were the first proteins identified in the fusome. Centrosomes travel along the fusome and the fusome is involved in microtubule organization. The interactions between the fusome and microtubules result in cyst polarity in oogenesis. Associations between the fusome and microtubules change throughout the cell cycle. Mitochondria associates with the fusome and travel through ring canals to the oocyte. Microtubules travel through ring canals and form the tracks for transport of materials between cells.

== Function ==
There are numerous functions of the fusome as a structure necessary for cell-cell communication in developing germ cell cysts. The fusome connects cells, allowing for transport of proteins and RNAs between cells and synchronous activities. Mutations in essential fusome components can result in infertility.

2.1 Role in cell cycle synchrony

Developing cells in germline cysts undergo mitotic divisions synchronously and in males all cells in a cyst also undergo meiosis synchronously. The fusome is a track where an event can happen and then feedback mechanisms quickly communicate to each cell to ensure a specific outcome occurs simultaneously in every cell. Cells in a cyst fail to divide synchronously if the fusome is disrupted. The rosette formation of germline cyst cells allows cells to be in the closest configuration for communication.

Throughout the cell cycle, different cyclins associate with the fusome to induce synchronous cell divisions. Cyclin A and Cyclin E localize to the fusome in female germline cysts and are required for the correct number of mitotic divisions to occur. Abnormal cyclin levels result in too few or too many divisions. Cyclin E at the fusome is phosphorylated for degradation by the SCF complex and if not degraded, an extra division occurs. The fusome may be the degradation site for other cell cycle proteins. Myt1 kinase inhibits CycA/Cdk1 in males during G2. Without Myt1 regulation, fusome and centrosome behavior is abnormal, resulting in cells with irregular spindles.

2.2 Differences in male vs female fusomes

In females, the fusome plays a role in cell fate and differentiation. Asymmetric fusome distribution and centriole orientation determines which cell in the developing female germline cyst becomes the oocyte. One of the two cells from the first division within the cyst becomes the oocyte and contains the most fusome material. The fusome degrades after the 16-cell cyst forms. In females, the connections are the channels through which nurse cells send proteins and RNAs to the oocyte along polarized microtubules.

In males, the fusome is necessary for ensuring quality control in individual cysts. DNA damage in one cell leads to all cells in a cyst dying by communication through the fusome, either by disseminating a death signal or additive DNA damage inducing apoptosis. This ensures mature sperm cells have intact genomes before fertilizing an egg. In addition, the fusome connections ensure haploid spermatids have proteins and RNA made by the other chromosome for “gamete equivalency”.

== Similar structures in other animals ==
Fusomes were previously thought to be specific to insect gametogenesis. Fusome-like structures have been identified in Xenopus laevis oogenesis by electron microscopy and immunostaining for fusome components such as spectrin and hts. Intercellular bridges also connect developing germ cells in mammals, contributing to cell cycle synchrony and gamete quality control by sharing substances between cells. Future studies are required to elucidate all of the functions that arise from cell-cell communication through intercellular bridges. In addition, a future area of research is to determine why some organisms lack fusomes. Do these organisms have another structure that carries out the role of the fusome or are these roles not necessary in germline cyst development of these other organisms?

== See also ==
- Intercellular junctions
- Gametogenesis
- Spectrin
- Cyclin
