= Bone marrow =

Semi-solid tissue in the spongy portions of bones

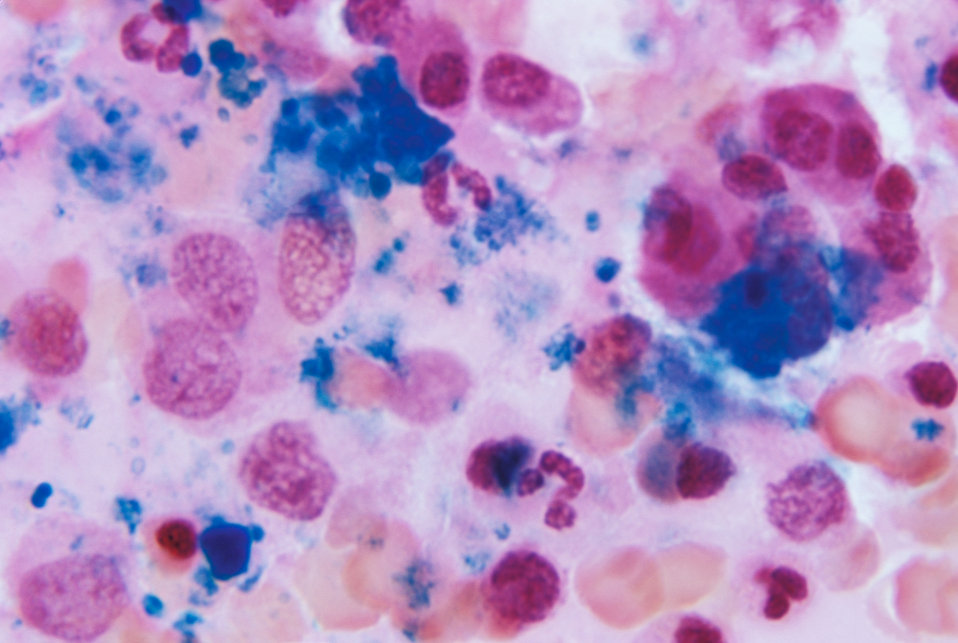
- A section of bone marrow tissue (Prussian blue-stained)

Details
- System: Hematopoietic system, immune system, lymphatic system

Identifiers
- Latin: medulla ossium
- MeSH: D001853
- TA98: A13.1.01.001
- TA2: 388
- FMA: 9608

Bone marrow is a semi-solid tissue found within the spongy (also known as cancellous) portions of bones. In birds and mammals, bone marrow is the primary site of new blood cell production (or haematopoiesis). It is composed of hematopoietic cells, marrow adipose tissue, and supportive stromal cells. In adult humans, bone marrow is primarily located in the ribs, vertebrae, sternum, and bones of the pelvis. Bone marrow comprises approximately 5% of total body mass in healthy adult humans, such that a person weighing 73 kg (161 lbs) will have around 3.7 kg (8 lbs) of bone marrow.

Human marrow produces approximately 500 billion blood cells per day, which join the systemic circulation via permeable vasculature sinusoids within the medullary cavity. All types of hematopoietic cells, including both myeloid and lymphoid lineages, are created in bone marrow; however, lymphoid cells must migrate to other lymphoid organs (e.g. thymus) in order to complete maturation.

Bone marrow transplants can be conducted to treat severe diseases of the bone marrow, including certain forms of cancer such as leukemia. Several types of stem cells are related to bone marrow. Hematopoietic stem cells in the bone marrow can give rise to hematopoietic lineage cells, and mesenchymal stem cells, which can be isolated from the primary culture of bone marrow stroma, can give rise to bone, adipose, and cartilage tissue.

== Structure ==
The composition of marrow is dynamic, as the mixture of cellular and non-cellular components (connective tissue) shifts with age and in response to systemic factors. In humans, marrow is colloquially characterized as red bone marrow, or yellow bone marrow (Latin: medulla ossium rubra and medulla ossium flava, respectively) depending on the prevalence of hematopoietic cells vs fat cells. While the precise mechanisms underlying marrow regulation are not understood, compositional changes occur according to stereotypical patterns. For example, a newborn baby's bones exclusively contain hematopoietically active red marrow, and there is a progressive conversion towards yellow marrow with age. In adults, red marrow is found mainly in the central skeleton, such as the pelvis, sternum, cranium, ribs, vertebrae and scapulae, and variably found in the proximal epiphyseal ends of long bones such as the femur and humerus. In circumstances of chronic hypoxia, the body can convert yellow marrow back to red marrow to increase blood cell production.

=== Hematopoietic components ===
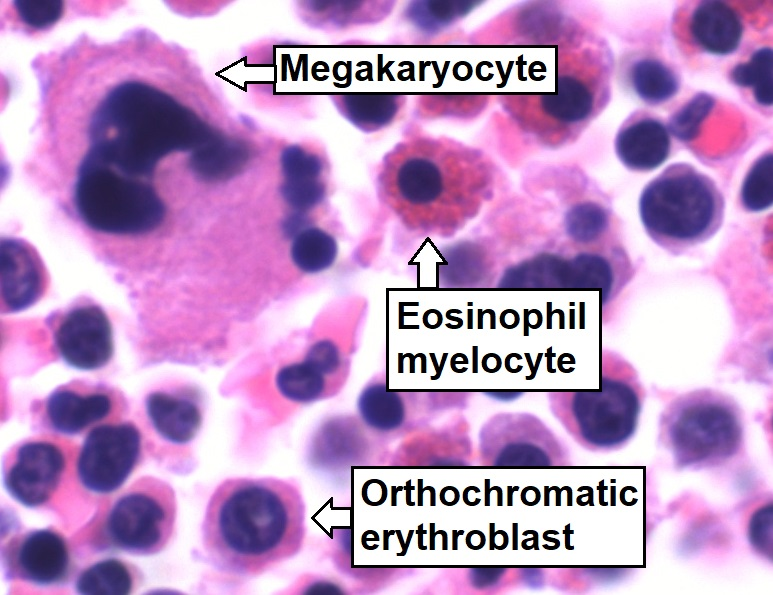
Bone marrow aspirate showing normal "trilineage hematopoiesis": myelomonocytic cells (an eosinophil myelocyte marked), erythroid cells (an orthochromatic erythroblast marked), and megakaryocytic cells

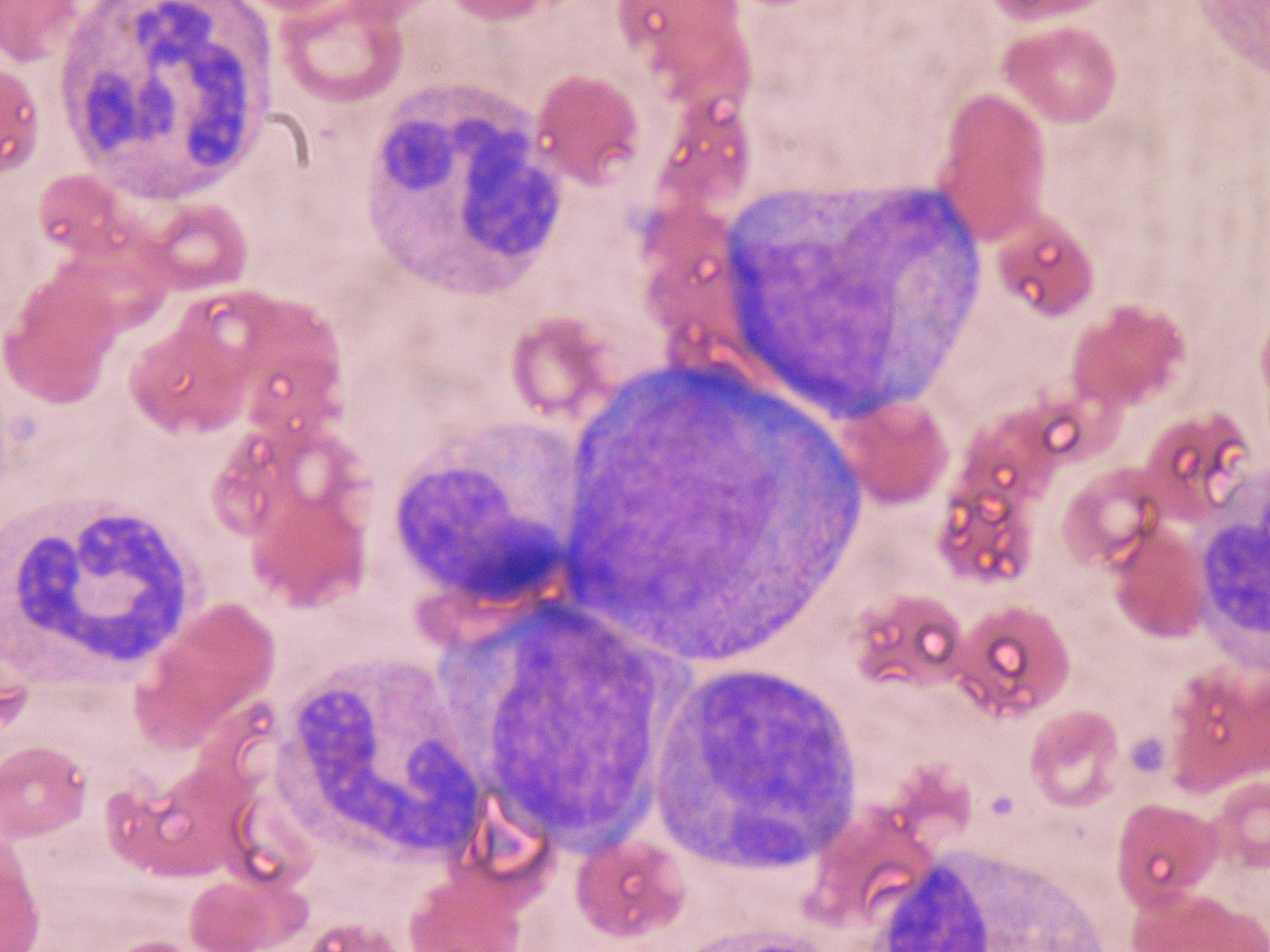
Hematopoietic precursor cells: promyelocyte in the center, two metamyelocytes next to it and band cells from a bone marrow aspirate

At the cellular level, the main functional component of bone marrow includes the progenitor cells which are destined to mature into blood and lymphoid cells. Human marrow produces approximately 500 billion blood cells per day. Marrow contains hematopoietic stem cells which give rise to the three classes of blood cells that are found in circulation: white blood cells (leukocytes), red blood cells (erythrocytes), and platelets (thrombocytes).

Cellular constitution of the red bone marrow parenchyma
Group	Cell type	Average fraction	Reference range
Myelopoietic cells	Myeloblasts	0.9%	0.2–1.5
Myelopoietic cells	Promyelocytes	3.3%	2.1–4.1
Myelopoietic cells	Neutrophilic myelocytes	12.7%	8.2–15.7
Myelopoietic cells	Eosinophilic myelocytes	0.8%	0.2–1.3
Myelopoietic cells	Neutrophilic metamyelocytes	15.9%	9.6–24.6
Myelopoietic cells	Eosinophilic metamyelocytes	1.2%	0.4–2.2
Myelopoietic cells	Neutrophilic band cells	12.4%	9.5–15.3
Myelopoietic cells	Eosinophilic band cells	0.9%	0.2–2.4
Myelopoietic cells	Segmented neutrophils	7.4%	6.0–12.0
Myelopoietic cells	Segmented eosinophils	0.5%	0.0–1.3
Myelopoietic cells	Segmented basophils and mast cells	0.1%	0.0–0.2
Erythropoietic cells	Pronormoblasts	0.6%	0.2–1.3
Erythropoietic cells	Basophilic normoblasts	1.4%	0.5–2.4
Erythropoietic cells	Polychromatic normoblasts	21.6%	17.9–29.2
Erythropoietic cells	Orthochromatic normoblast	2.0%	0.4–4.6
Other cell types	Megakaryocytes	< 0.1%	0.0-0.4
Other cell types	Plasma cells	1.3%	0.4-3.9
Other cell types	Reticular cells	0.3%	0.0-0.9
Other cell types	Lymphocytes	16.2%	11.1-23.2
Other cell types	Monocytes	0.3%	0.0-0.8

=== Stroma ===
The stroma of the bone marrow includes all tissue not directly involved in its primary function of hematopoiesis. Stromal cells support hematopoiesis indirectly by providing a specialized microenvironment that influences the function and differentiation of hematopoietic cells. For example, they produce colony-stimulating factors, which play a significant role in regulating blood cell formation.

Cell types that constitute the bone marrow stroma include:

- Fibroblasts (reticular connective tissue)
- Macrophages, which contribute especially to red blood cell production by delivering iron for hemoglobin synthesis
- Adipocytes (fat cells)
- Osteoblasts (synthesize bone)
- Osteoclasts (resorb bone)
- Endothelial cells, which form the sinusoids. These are derived from endothelial stem cells, which are also present in the bone marrow.

== Function ==
=== Central hematopoietic and antigen-responsive organ ===
Bone marrow is a priming site for T-cell responses to blood-borne antigens, as first described in 2003. Mature circulating naïve T cells travel to bone marrow sinuses after they have passed through arteries and arterioles. They transmigrate sinus endothelium and enter the parenchyma which contains dendritic cells (DCs). These have a capacity of antigen uptake, processing, and presentation. Cognate interactions between antigen-specific T cells and antigen-presenting DCs (APCs) in parenchyma lead to rapid T-APC cluster formation followed by T cell activation, T cell proliferation and T cell re-circulation to blood. These findings were corroborated and extended in 2013 by in situ two-photon dynamic imaging of mice skulls.

=== Importance for storage and long-term survival of memory B and memory T cells ===
Bone marrow is a nest for migratory memory T cells and a sanctuary for plasma cells. This has implications for adaptive immunity and vaccinology. Memory B and T cells persist in the parenchyma in dedicated survival niches organized by stromal cells. This memory can be maintained over long time periods in the form of quiescent cells or by repeated antigenic restimulation. Bone marrow protects and optimizes immunological memory during dietary restriction. In cancer patients, cancer-reactive memory T cells can arise in bone marrow spontaneously or after specific vaccination. Bone marrow is a center of a variety of immune activities: i) hematopoiesis, ii) osteogenesis, iii) immune responses, iv) distinction between self and non-self antigens, v) central immune regulatory function, vi) storage of memory cells, vii) immune surveillance of the central nervous system, viii) adaptation to energy crisis, ix) provision of mesenchymal stem cells for tissue repair.

=== Mesenchymal stem cells ===
The bone marrow stroma contains mesenchymal stem cells (MSCs), which are also known as marrow stromal cells. These are multipotent stem cells that can differentiate into a variety of cell types. MSCs have been shown to differentiate, in vitro or in vivo, into osteoblasts, chondrocytes, myocytes, marrow adipocytes and beta-pancreatic islets cells.

=== Bone marrow barrier ===
The blood vessels of the bone marrow constitute a barrier, inhibiting immature blood cells from leaving the marrow. Only mature blood cells contain the membrane proteins, such as aquaporin and glycophorin, that are required to attach to and pass the blood vessel endothelium. Hematopoietic stem cells may also cross the bone marrow barrier, and may thus be harvested from blood.

=== Lymphatic role ===
The red bone marrow is a key element of the lymphatic system, being one of the primary lymphoid organs that generate lymphocytes from immature hematopoietic progenitor cells. The bone marrow and thymus constitute the primary lymphoid tissues involved in the production and early selection of lymphocytes. Furthermore, bone marrow performs a valve-like function to prevent the backflow of lymphatic fluid in the lymphatic system.

=== Compartmentalization ===
Biological compartmentalization is evident within the bone marrow, in that certain cell types tend to aggregate in specific areas. For instance, erythrocytes, macrophages, and their precursors tend to gather around blood vessels, while granulocytes gather at the borders of the bone marrow.

== As food ==
People have used animal bone-marrow in cuisine worldwide for millennia, as in the famed Milanese Ossobuco.

== Clinical significance ==
=== Disease ===
The normal bone marrow architecture can be damaged or displaced by aplastic anemia, malignancies such as multiple myeloma, or infections such as tuberculosis, leading to a decrease in the production of blood cells and blood platelets. The bone marrow can also be affected by various forms of leukemia, which attacks its hematologic progenitor cells. Furthermore, exposure to radiation or chemotherapy will kill many of the rapidly dividing cells of the bone marrow, and will therefore result in a depressed immune system. Many of the symptoms of radiation poisoning are due to damage sustained by the bone marrow cells.

To diagnose diseases involving the bone marrow, a bone marrow aspiration is sometimes performed. This typically involves using a hollow needle to acquire a sample of red bone marrow from the crest of the ilium under general or local anesthesia.

=== Imaging ===
Medical imaging may provide a limited amount of information regarding bone marrow. Plain film x-rays pass through soft tissues such as marrow and do not provide visualization, although any changes in the structure of the associated bone may be detected. CT imaging has somewhat better capacity for assessing the marrow cavity of bones, although with low sensitivity and specificity. For example, normal fatty "yellow" marrow in adult long bones is of low density (-30 to -100 Hounsfield units), between subcutaneous fat and soft tissue. Tissue with increased cellular composition, such as normal "red" marrow or cancer cells within the medullary cavity will measure variably higher in density.

MRI is more sensitive and specific for assessing bone composition. MRI enables assessment of the average molecular composition of soft tissues and thus provides information regarding the relative fat content of marrow. In adult humans, "yellow" fatty marrow is the dominant tissue in bones, particularly in the (peripheral) appendicular skeleton. Because fat molecules have a high T1-relaxivity, T1-weighted imaging sequences show "yellow" fatty marrow as bright (hyperintense). Furthermore, normal fatty marrow loses signal on fat-saturation sequences, in a similar pattern to subcutaneous fat.

When "yellow" fatty marrow becomes replaced by tissue with more cellular composition, this change is apparent as decreased brightness on T1-weighted sequences. Both normal "red" marrow and pathologic marrow lesions (such as cancer) are darker than "yellow" marrow on T1-weight sequences, although can often be distinguished by comparison with the MR signal intensity of adjacent soft tissues. Normal "red" marrow is typically equivalent or brighter than skeletal muscle or intervertebral disc on T1-weighted sequences.

Fatty marrow change, the inverse of red marrow hyperplasia, can occur with normal aging, though it can also be seen with certain treatments such as radiation therapy. Diffuse marrow T1 hypointensity without contrast enhancement or cortical discontinuity suggests red marrow conversion or myelofibrosis. Falsely normal marrow on T1 can be seen with diffuse multiple myeloma or leukemic infiltration when the water to fat ratio is not sufficiently altered, as may be seen with lower grade tumors or earlier in the disease process.

=== Histology ===
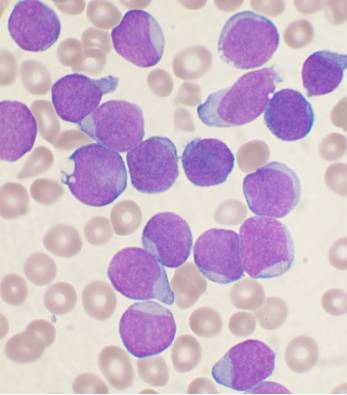
A Wright's-stained bone marrow aspirate smear from a patient with leukemia

Bone marrow examination is the pathologic analysis of samples of bone marrow obtained via biopsy and bone marrow aspiration. Bone marrow examination is used in the diagnosis of a number of conditions, including leukemia, multiple myeloma, anemia, and pancytopenia. The bone marrow produces the cellular elements of the blood, including platelets, red blood cells and white blood cells. While much information can be gleaned by testing the blood itself (drawn from a vein by phlebotomy), it is sometimes necessary to examine the source of the blood cells in the bone marrow to obtain more information on hematopoiesis; this is the role of bone marrow aspiration and biopsy.

The ratio between myeloid series and erythroid cells is relevant to bone marrow function, and also to diseases of the bone marrow and peripheral blood, such as leukemia and anemia. The normal myeloid-to-erythroid ratio is around 3:1; this ratio may increase in myelogenous leukemias, decrease in polycythemias, and reverse in cases of thalassemia.

=== Donation and transplantation ===
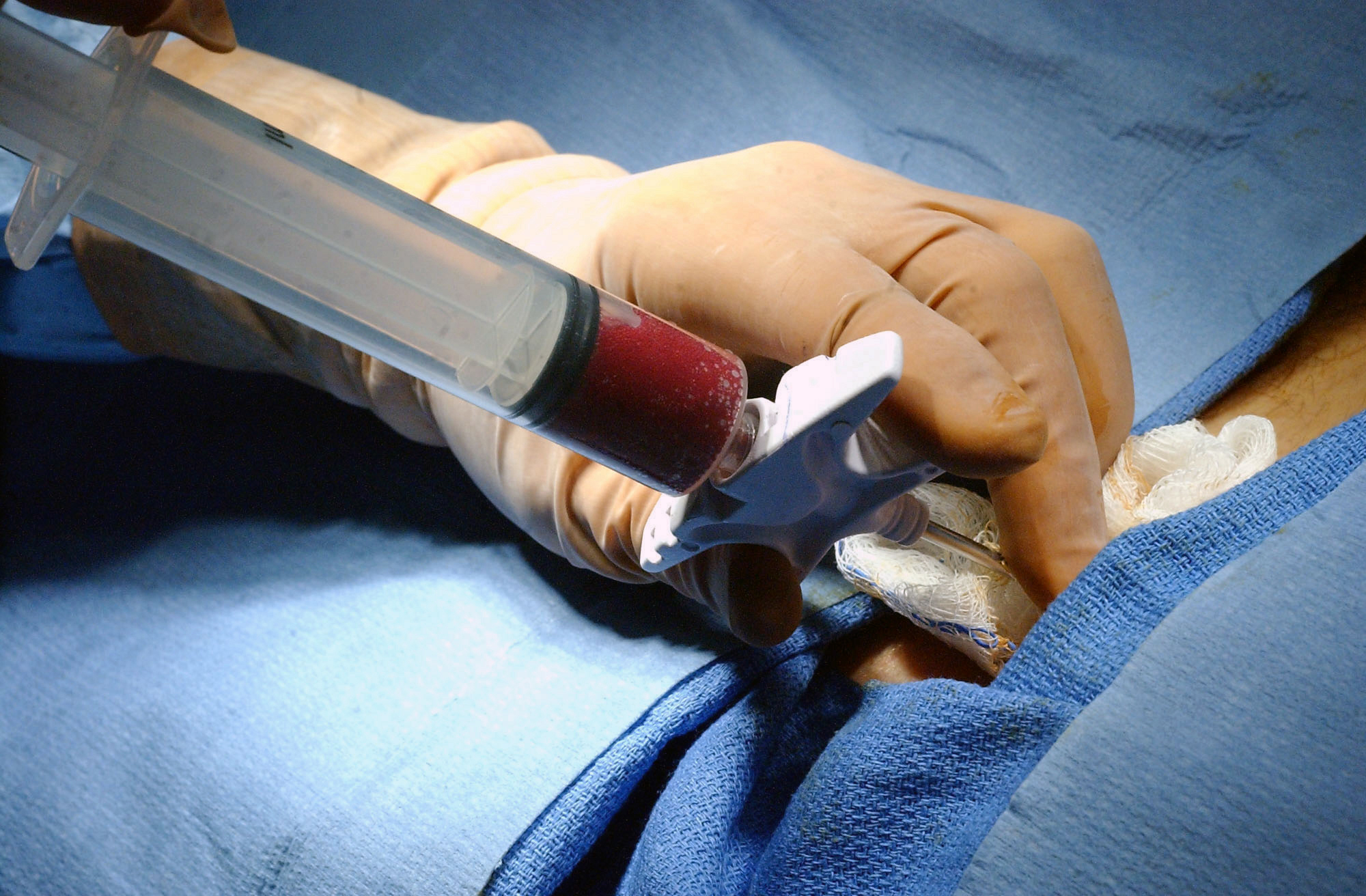
A bone marrow harvest in progress

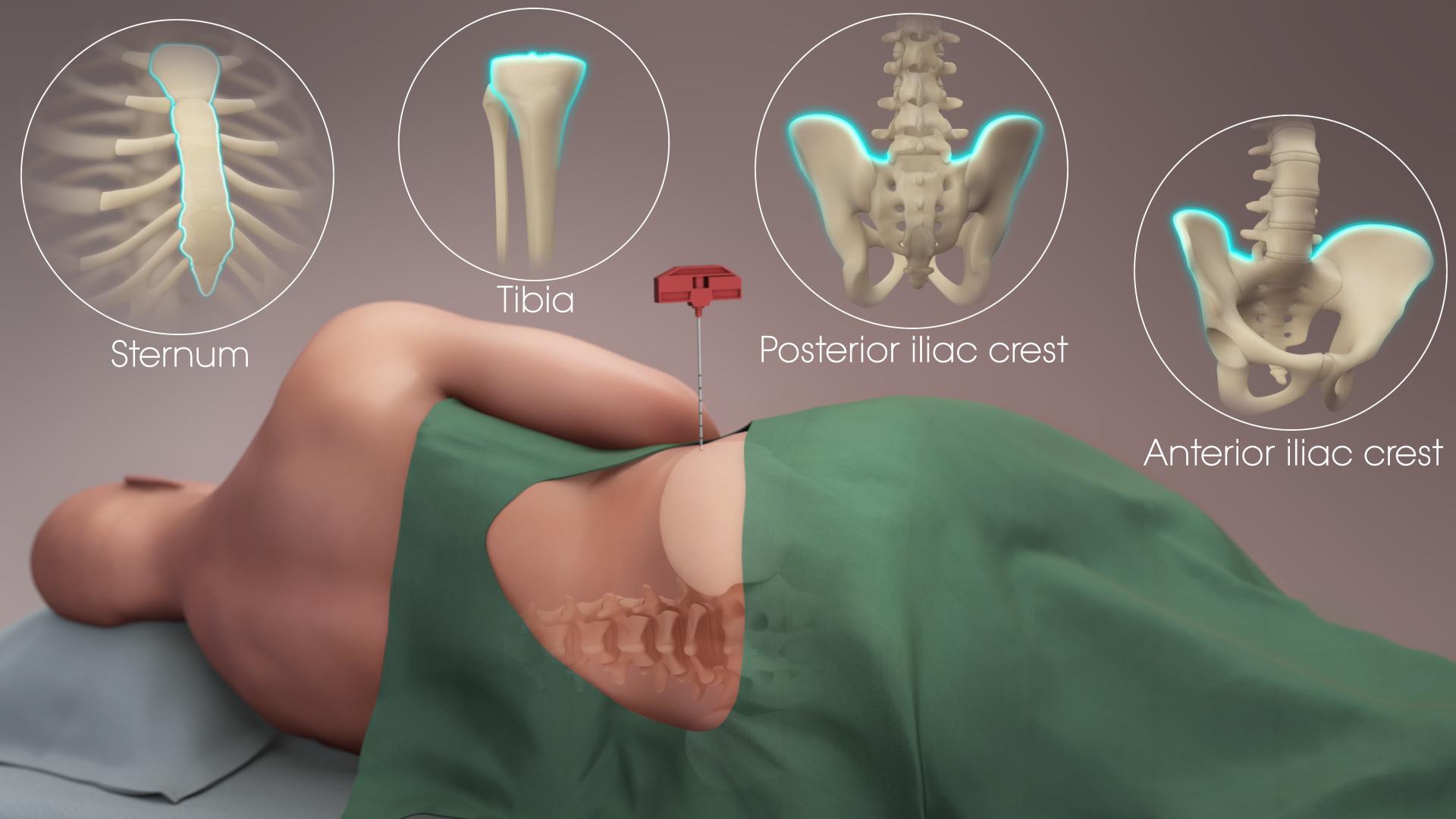
The preferred sites for the procedure

In a bone marrow transplant, hematopoietic stem cells are removed from a person and infused into another person (allogeneic) or into the same person at a later time (autologous). If the donor and recipient are compatible, these infused cells will then travel to the bone marrow and initiate blood cell production. Transplantation from one person to another is conducted for the treatment of severe bone marrow diseases, such as congenital defects, autoimmune diseases or malignancies. The patient's own marrow is first killed off with drugs or radiation, and then the new stem cells are introduced. Before radiation therapy or chemotherapy in cases of cancer, some of the patient's hematopoietic stem cells are sometimes harvested and later infused back when the therapy is finished to restore the immune system.

Bone marrow stem cells can be induced to become neural cells to treat neurological illnesses, and can also potentially be used for the treatment of other illnesses, such as inflammatory bowel disease. In 2013, following a clinical trial, scientists proposed that bone marrow transplantation could be used to treat HIV in conjunction with antiretroviral drugs; however, it was later found that HIV remained in the bodies of the test subjects.

==== Harvesting ====
The stem cells are typically harvested directly from the red marrow in the iliac crest, often under general anesthesia. The procedure is minimally invasive and does not require stitches afterwards. Depending on the donor's health and reaction to the procedure, the actual harvesting can be an outpatient procedure, or can require 1–2 days of recovery in the hospital.

Another option is to administer certain drugs that stimulate the release of stem cells from the bone marrow into circulating blood. An intravenous catheter is inserted into the donor's arm, and the stem cells are then filtered out of the blood. This procedure is similar to that used in blood or platelet donation. In adults, bone marrow may also be taken from the sternum, while the tibia is often used when taking samples from infants. In newborns, stem cells may be retrieved from the umbilical cord.

=== Fertility aid ===
One of the most damaged areas of the body following chemotherapy is typically the uterus. Following uterine damage due to cancer treatment, follicle damage makes it difficult for individuals to get pregnant even if viable ova are present. With bone marrow stem cell transplants, chemotherapy patients have been able to increase their fertility as follicle damage is repaired. As follicles are necessary for ovum attachment to the endometrium, it is important for these areas to be repaired in order to increase fertility. For individuals who have sustained egg and follicle damage, IVF has been found to be more effective following bone marrow stem cell transplantation.

One human clinical case has shown improvements of uterine lining thickness and overall endometrium repair following bone marrow stem cell transplantation. This repair allowed for the patient to successfully become pregnant and carry to term.

Additional repairs following bone marrow stem cell transplant to the endometrium include increased vascularity and iron levels, with egg implantation clustering around areas with high blood flow.

=== Persistent viruses ===
Using quantitative polymerase chain reaction (qPCR) and next-generation sequencing (NGS) a maximum of five DNA viruses per individual have been identified. Included were several herpesviruses, hepatitis B virus, Merkel cell polyomavirus, and human papillomavirus 31. Given the reactivation and/or oncogenic potential of these viruses, their repercussion on hematopoietic and malignant disorders calls for further studies.

== Fossil record ==
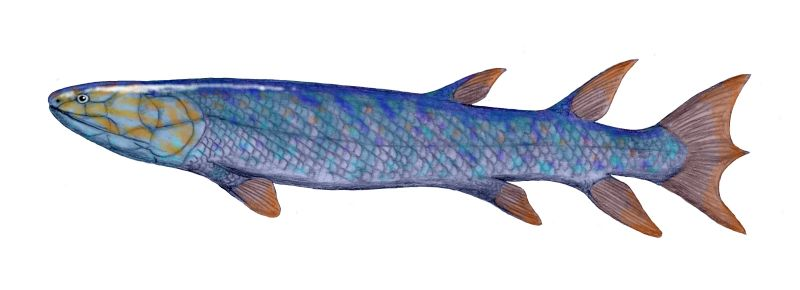
Bone marrow may have first evolved in Eusthenopteron, a species of prehistoric fish with close links to early tetrapods.

The earliest fossilised evidence of bone marrow was discovered in 2014 in Eusthenopteron, a lobe-finned fish which lived during the Devonian period approximately 370 million years ago. Scientists from Uppsala University and the European Synchrotron Radiation Facility used X-ray synchrotron microtomography to study the fossilised interior of the skeleton's humerus, finding organised tubular structures akin to modern vertebrate bone marrow. Eusthenopteron is closely related to the early tetrapods, which ultimately evolved into the land-dwelling mammals and reptiles of the present day.

== See also ==
- LOC100272216 protein
- Myelonecrosis
- National Marrow Donor Program
- Gift of Life Marrow Registry
- List of distinct cell types in the adult human body
