= Ovariole =

Component of insect ovaries

A generalized insect ovariole of the panoistic type, showing the germarium, developing oocytpes in follicles, and the oviduct.

An ovariole is a tubular component of the insect ovary, and the basic unit of egg production. Each ovariole is composed of a germarium (the germline stem cell niche) at the anterior tip, a set of developing oocytes contained within follicles, and a posterior connection to a common oviduct. While most insects have two ovaries, the number of ovarioles within each ovary varies across insect species. This number may also be variable across individuals within a species, or between the left and right ovaries within an individual.

== Types ==
Types of ovarioles: panoistic lack nurse cells, meroistic have nurse cells that are located either adjacent to the oocyte (polytrophic) or in the germarium (telotrophic).

Ovarioles are often classified into one of several types by the presence and position of nurse cells. These specialized cells provide nutrition and molecules important for embryonic patterning to the developing oocyte. Ovarioles that lack nurse cells are referred to as panoistic and ovarioles with nurse cells are referred to as meroistic.

Meroistic ovarioles are further classified according to where nurse cells are located. In polytrophic meroistic ovarioles, nurse cells are adjacent to the developing oocyte. In telotrophic meroistic ovarioles, nurse cells are located in the germarium and connect to developing ooctypes via nutritive cords.

== In Drosophila melanogaster ==
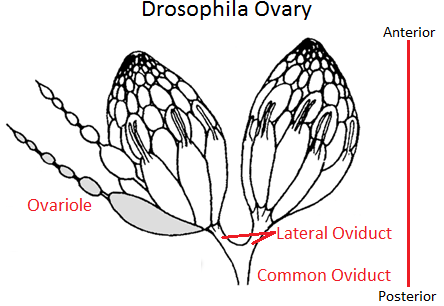
A diagram of the ovary of the fruit fly Drosophila melanogaster, showing multiple ovarioles within the two ovaries, each containing multiple developing oocytes.

In the fruit fly Drosophila melanogaster, a common model organism for developmental research, each ovary typically contains between 16 and 20 polytrophic meroistic ovarioles. These ovarioles continuously produce eggs through division and differentiation of the germline stem cells, located in the anterior tip of the germarium. There are also several populations of somatic support cells in the germarium, including terminal filament cells, cap cells, and anterior escort cells.

The process of oogenesis within the Drosophila ovariole has been divided into 14 identifiable stages. Developing oocytes are arranged within the ovariole in an ontogenic series, with early stage oocytes toward the anterior and later stage oocytes posterior. At the end of stage 14, the egg passes through the lateral oviduct before entering the common oviduct and then exiting via the uterus.
