= LOC100272216 =

Putative RNA gene in humans

uncharacterized LOC100272216

Identifiers
- Aliases: LOC100272216
- External IDs: GeneCards:
Orthologs
Databases	n/a
Species	Human	Mouse
Entrez	n/a	n/a
Ensembl	n/a	n/a
UniProt	n a	n/a
RefSeq (mRNA)	n/a	n/a
RefSeq (protein)	n/a	n/a
Location (UCSC)	n/a	n/a
PubMed search		n/a
- Wikidata
View/Edit Human

LOC100272216 was a putative gene, that was thought to encode a non-coding RNA in humans. Its record has been withdrawn from NCBI due to evidence that it was mistakenly placed on the wrong strand.
