= Limb-sparing techniques =

Medical procedure

Limb-sparing techniques, also known as limb-saving or limb-salvage surgery, are performed in order to preserve the appearance and function of limbs. Limb-sparing techniques are used to preserve limbs affected by trauma, arthritis, cancers such as high-grade bone sarcomas, and vascular conditions such as diabetic foot ulcers. As the techniques in chemotherapy, radiation, and diagnostic modalities improve, there has been a trend toward limb-sparing procedures to avoid amputation, which has been associated with a lower 5-year survival rate and cost-effectiveness compared to limb salvage. There are many different types of limb-sparing techniques focusing on the preservation or reconstruction of soft tissue, bone, or other vital functional structures.

== Bone reconstruction ==
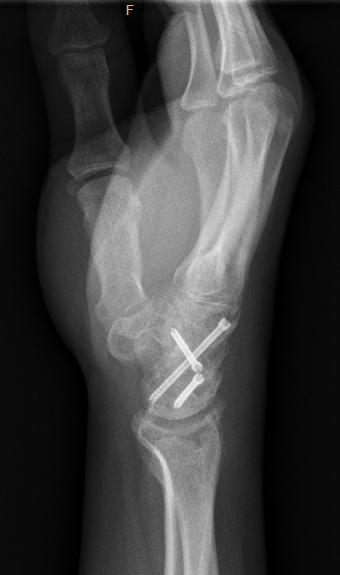
X-ray of a wrist that has undergone carpal arthrodesis (fusion of the wrist joint). In this case, this means that screws have been inserted through multiple wrist bones so they are now immobilized. Over time, these bones will fuse together, preventing them from rubbing against each other and causing pain.

In bone cancers of the long bones, such as osteosarcoma and Ewing sarcoma, the priority for treatment is complete removal of the cancer with negative margins. In such cases, limb-sparing surgery is preferred when neurovascular structures are not involved. Limb sparing procedures that may be considered include endoprostheses, autograft, and allograft.

=== Endoprostheses ===
Endoprosthesis refers to metal prosthesis that are used to replace the resected bone.Prosthetic implants are often used when sections of bone must be replaced and no further growth is expected. In children, expandable prostheses may provide a prosthetic reconstruction option. Although these are a versatile solution, endoprosthesis have a high failure rate, often requiring reoperation. Infection, loosening of the hardware, implant wear, and soft tissue dehicense all threaten the long term viability of this reconstruction. There are many prosthetics available, depending on the bone or joint that requires reconstruction and can be temporary or permanent.

=== Autograft ===
An autograft utilizes a patient's own bone to fill in the area of missing bone. In autografting, a piece of bone that is expendable from another part of the body is moved in order to fill the area with a defect, or missing bone. Both cancellous and cortical bone may be harvested depending on several factors, such as the need of mechanical support and size of the defect. Cancellous bone does not provide mechanical support for a defect but rather provides a scaffold for new bone to grow in due to its osteoinductive nature and high number of osteogenic factors and cells. Cortical bone grafts provide much better mechanical support for a defect, but have very little of the osteoinductive properties found in cancellous bone. Cortical bone grafts can either be taken with associate vascular supply, referred to as a vascularized bone graft, or without. The most common vascularized bone graft is a free fibula graft, where a piece of the fibula is taken along with the peroneal artery and reconnected at the site of the bone defect.

Particularly in growing children, the success of reconstructive procedures following cancer surgery is dependent on the location of the tumor and necessary resection. In cases of diaphyseal tumors, biologic replacements, such as allograft is ideal. In tumors involving the metaphyseal region, the growth plate may be affected by the surgery to remove the tumor. In such cases, there is concern for limb-growth disparities due to the disturbed growth plate. When the growth plate of the fibula is included in the graft, it can allow for continued growth of the transplanted bone. Due to this it is often used in cases of proximal humerus sarcoma in young patients and diaphysial reconstruction.

=== Allograft ===
Allografting refers to the transfer of cadaveric bone to fill in the defect. Typically these procedures are performed in conjunction with metal supports, like plates or rods, as allografts tend to weaken over time and have a higher rate of structural failure. Allografting is the treatment of choice for diaphyseal tumors, small defects, and when the patient is awaiting a custom endoprosthesis. Allografts can be divided into several overarching categories: structural allografts where an intact piece of bone is utilized; non-structural particulate allografts where bone pieces are utilized to fill a small defect; and demineralized bone matrix which extracts only protein, collagen and growth factors from the cadaveric bone with the goal of providing a scaffold for bone growth.

=== Alloprosthetic composites ===
Alloprosthetic composites are a combination of multiple limb-sparing techniques, namely allografts and prosthesis. Allografts are used to replace the bone that has been resected and then prosthesis is used to support and strengthen the allografts. Alloprosthetic composites are flexible in that surgeons can adapt the implants for any situation.

== Soft tissue reconstruction ==
Both trauma and oncologic resection can cause a large defect where removal of enough soft tissue, such as skin, muscle, and fat, leads to the limb being threatened. In the case of insufficient soft tissue to cover the bone or vital structures such as vasculature, tendons and nerves, several techniques can be employed to cover the tissue, including local flaps and free tissue transfer. Furthermore, these strategies can be considered in oncologic cases where there is neurovascular involvement.

=== Local flap ===
When possible, local tissue may be rearranged to cover the defect. Examples of this type of procedure involve a rotational flap, where tissue with corresponding vasculature is rotated into place to cover the missing soft tissue, and advancement flaps, where the surrounding tissue is freed such that it can be advanced to cover the defect. These methods can be used when a limb is threatened by exposed structures.

In a rotational or propeller flap, a specific artery, or perforator, is identified for blood supply of the flap and soft tissue is rotated between 90 and 180 degrees axially in order to cover a specific defect. In the lower extremity, the peroneal, posterior tibial, and anterior tibial arteries have all been described as successful sources of propeller flap blood supply. The flap, composed of skin and fascia, is used to cover any exposed vital structures, like nerves or bone.

=== Free flap transfer ===
In cases where there is insufficient local tissue to cover the vital structures necessary, free flap transfer can be considered. In free flap transfer or pedicled flap, tissue from an area of the body where it can be spared is taken with its associated vasculature and reattached at the site of the defect. There are many free flap procedures that can be considered, depending upon the size of the defect and type of tissue needed. Flaps may be muscular, cutaneous, fasciocutaneous, or musculocutaneous and include nerves for innervation. In muscular flaps, only muscle is transferred. Examples include latissimus dorsi, gracillis, and rectus abdominis flaps. This type of flap can be useful both to fill a defect and as an innervated muscle to restore function to a limb. Cutaneous flaps refer to those involving only skin, while fasciocutaneous involve both the skin and underlying subcutaneous tissue and fascia. In a musculocutaneous flap, skin, subcutaneous tissue, and muscle are all transferred.

The type of flap procedure used to repair a limb-threatening defect varies by location, size, and the type of tissue needed. For example, if muscle is resected during a cancer surgery, the reconstructive surgeon may consider taking a flap that involves innervated muscle to restore function of that muscle. In lower limb reconstruction, anterolateral thigh (ALT) fasciocutaneous and latissimus dorsi muscular flaps are most common. In upper limb reconstruction, the ALT flap is most commonly used.

== Functional reconstruction ==
When a trauma or cancer involves vital functional structures, such as tendons or nerves, transfer of these structures may become necessary to restore function to the limb. There are several types of functional reconstructions that are commonly performed, including tendon transfer, nerve transfer, functional muscle transfer, and joint salvage procedures.

=== Joint salvage ===
==== Arthrodesis ====
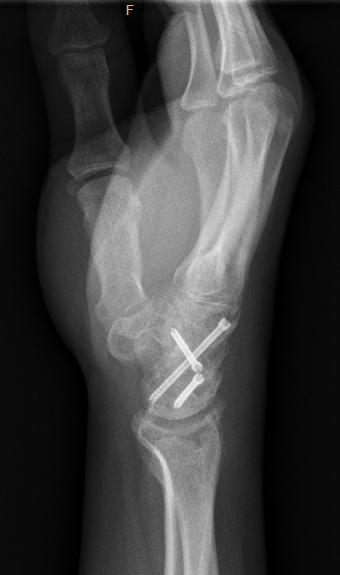
X-ray of a wrist that has undergone carpal arthrodesis (fusion of the wrist joint). In this case, this means that screws have been inserted through multiple wrist bones so they are now immobilized. Over time, these bones will fuse together, preventing them from rubbing against each other and causing pain.

Arthrodesis is the surgical immobilization of bones within a joint to promote fusion of the joint. Arthrodesis is performed most commonly on joints of the feet, hands, and spine. Arthrodesis can relieve pain from arthritis and fractures. This is accomplished through the use of orthobiologics such as allografts and autografts. Allografts are done by creating bone grafts from a donor bone bank, whereas autografts are bone grafts from other bones in a patient's body. Patient-reported outcomes following this procedure are typically positive in terms of long-term pain relief; however, the procedure also results in decreased range of motion.

==== Arthroplasty ====
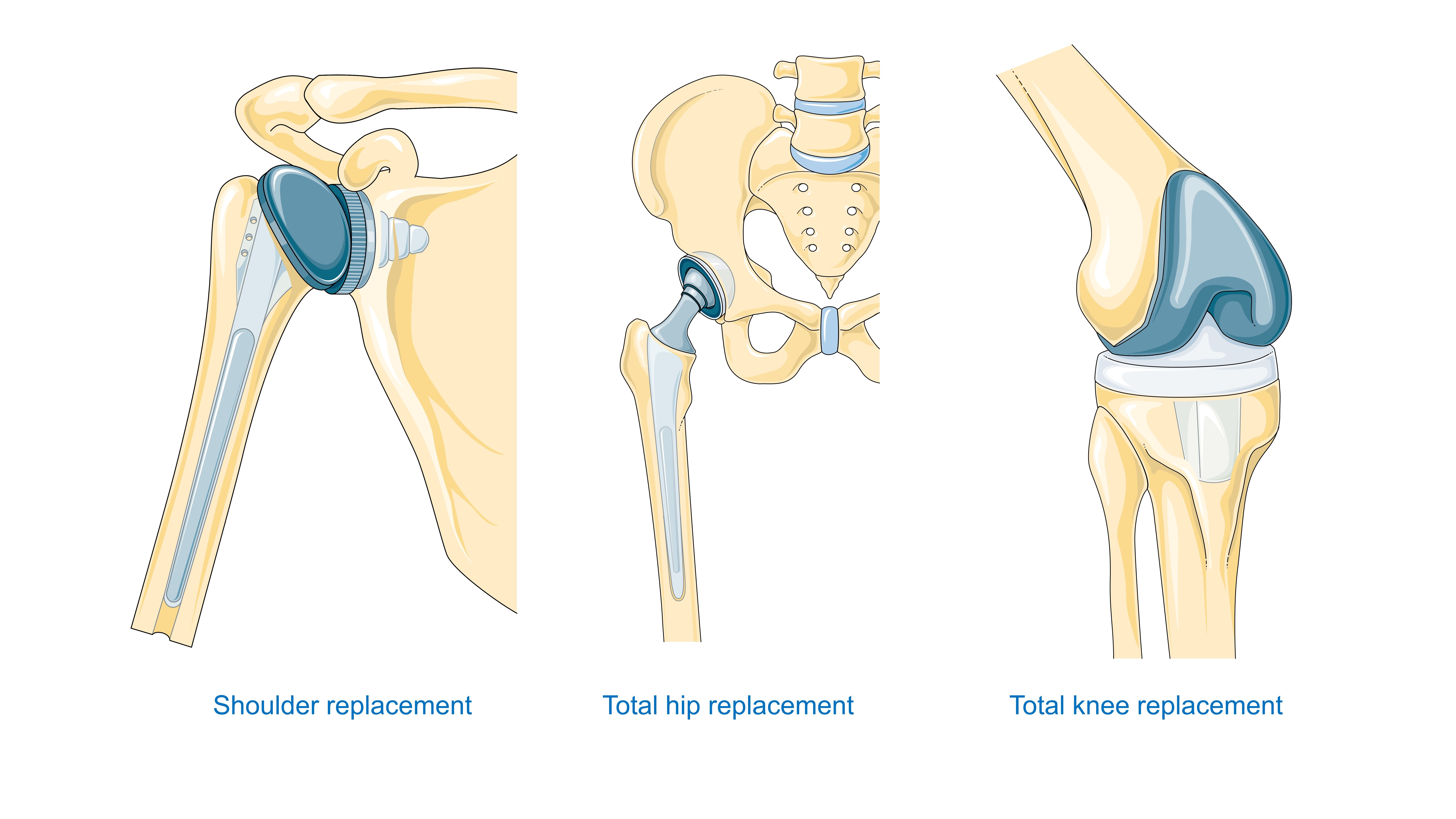
Diagrams of the most common joints that undergo arthroplasty (joint replacement): shoulders, hips, and knees. The articular surface of each joint has been removed and replaced with metal and plastic implants to recreate the normal joint interface.

Arthroplasty, otherwise known as joint replacement, is a surgical procedure which involves resurfacing, realignment, or removal of bone at a joint interface to restore the joint's function. Arthroplasty is often performed on hips, knees, shoulders, and ankles to improve range of motion and relieve pain from arthritis or trauma. Arthroplasty of the shoulder is one of the most common of these procedures, although it has only been widely used since 1955. Themistocles Gluck is thought to have created the first shoulder arthroplasty in the 1800s. Since Gluck never published any results or notes on the procedure, Jules-Emile Pean is credited with performing the first shoulder arthroplasty in 1893.

=== Rotationplasty ===
When limb salvage efforts fail, amputation may remain the only life-saving option for patients. In lower limb amputations, Rotationplasty, more commonly known as Van-Nes or Borggreve rotation, may be used to maximize functional preservation of the residual limb. In this procedure, a patient's leg is amputated at the knee and the ankle joint is then rotated 180 degrees and is attached to the former knee joint, becoming a new knee joint Rotationplasty retains the use of a knee joint and provides a better position for a prosthetic limb compared to amputation.

== Revascularization ==
Another common limb-threatening condition is poor blood flow to the extremity. Chronic limb-threatening ischemia or critical limb ischemia can occur with peripheral artery disease, where the pathology compromises blood circulation to an otherwise healthy limb. This can lead to numerous complications and both a high mortality and amputation rate. To achieve limb preservation, various techniques can be employed to achieve revascularization in patients with peripheral artery disease and related conditions.

=== Bypass surgery ===
Open bypass surgery can be performed when a vessel is severely compromised and the patient's own vein, or autogenous vein graft, can be identified. In this procedure, a vein is used to bypass the diseased portion of the vessel in the affected limb, allowing circulation to improve. Although prosthetic conduits have been used in lieu of autologous veins, the long term limb salvage rates of these is inferior to the patient's own veins. Furthermore, use of the patient's own vein demonstrated greater patency, or how open and unobstructed the vein is, and lower rates of re-intervention as compared to prosthetics.

=== Endovascular procedures ===
Endovascular procedures are performed in a minimally invasive manner, where only a small incision is created to access the vasculature and a thin, flexible tube is used to access the site of the disease and perform the procedure. These procedures include percutaneous transluminal angioplasty and atherectomy.

=== Revascularization with free flap ===
In some complex cases, patients may have peripheral artery disease threatening the circulation to a limb in combination with a deep wound that exposes vital structures such as tendon or nerves. For such cases a revascularization procedure, such as bypass grafting, can be combined with a microsurgical free flap in order to achieve both restoration of circulation and coverage of the exposed structures.
