= Maffucci syndrome =

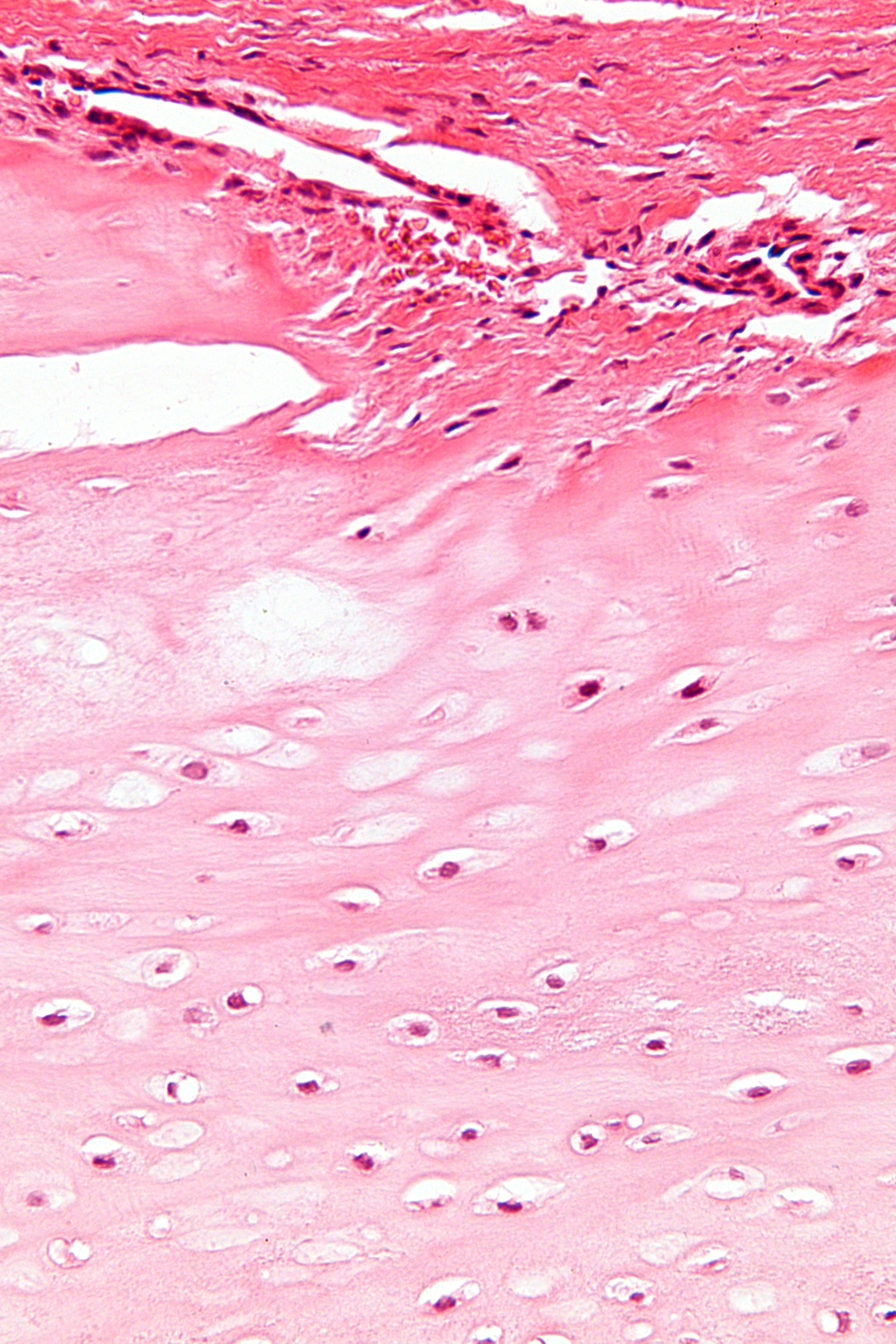
- Enchondromas are present in Maffucci syndrome
- Specialty: Medical genetics
- Frequency: 0.0001%

Maffucci syndrome is a very rare disorder in which multiple benign tumors of cartilage develop within the bones (such tumors are known as enchondromas). The tumors most commonly appear in the bones of the hands, feet, and limbs, causing bone deformities and short limbs.

It is named for the Italian pathologist Angelo Maffucci who described it in 1881. Fewer than 200 cases of this syndrome have been reported.

== Signs and symptoms ==
Patients are normal at birth and the syndrome manifests during childhood.

The enchondromas affect the extremities and their distribution is asymmetrical. The most common sites of enchondromas are the metacarpal bones and phalanges of the hands. The feet are less commonly affected. Disfigurations of the extremities are a result. Pathological fractures can arise in affected metaphyses and diaphyses of the long bones and are common (26%).

The risk for sarcomatous degeneration of enchondromas, hemangiomas, or lymphangiomas is 15–30% in the setting of Maffucci syndrome. Maffucci syndrome is associated with a higher risk of central nervous system, pancreatic, and ovarian malignancies. Multiple enchondromas may present in three disorders: Ollier disease, Maffucci syndrome, and metachondromatosis. It is important to make the distinction between these diseases, particularly Ollier disease and Maffucci syndrome. Ollier disease is more common than Maffucci syndrome, and presents with multiple enchondromas often in a unilateral distribution. However, hemangiomas and lymphangiomas are not seen in Ollier disease. Metachondromatosis demonstrates autosomal-dominant transmission and presents with both multiple osteochondromas and enchondromas.

It is associated with multiple cavernous hemangioma and phlebolith. Lymphangiomas may also be apparent.

== Cause ==
Maffucci syndrome is most commonly caused by mutations in the IDH1 or IDH2 gene.

== Diagnosis ==
=== Differential diagnosis ===
In Ollier's disease, isolated enchondromas are present without the presence of hemangiomas.

== Management ==
Management entails careful examination and monitoring for malignant degenerations. Surgical interventions can correct or minimize deformities.

== See also ==
- Ollier disease
- Njolstad syndrome
- List of cutaneous conditions
- List of radiographic findings associated with cutaneous conditions
