= Primary bone =

Primary bone is the first bone tissue that appears in embryonic development and in fracture repair. It is characterized by its random position of collagen fibers. In most places in adults this tissue is replaced by secondary bone tissue except, for example, near the sutures of calvara or tooth sockets. The secondary bones have lower amounts of osteocytes so primary bone is much more easily penetrated by x-ray.

== Clinical significance ==
Primary bone or the primary ossification center is the beginning of the bone building process during the first trimester. Calcificed cartilage is basophilic and new bone being made is more acidophilic. The primary ossification occurs in the diaphysis. In contrast, secondary ossification centers appear later at the epiphyses of the cartilage and develop similarly to the diaphysis.

=== Cancer ===
Primary bone cancer is a type of sarcoma, a cancer that originates in bone, muscle, fibrous tissue, blood vessels, fat tissue, as well as some other tissues. Primary bone cancer can arise in any of the 206 bones in the body but is mostly seen to originate the arms and the legs. The most common cases are observed in children and young adults. The following list includes types of primary bone cancer:

- Osteosarcoma
- Chondrosarcoma
- Ewing's Sarcoma
- Adamantinomas
- Chordomas

== See also ==
- Somite
- Somitogenesis
