= Metachondromatosis =

- Other names: METCDS
- Metachondromatosis has an autosomal dominant pattern of inheritance.
- Specialty: Oncology, orthopedics
- Symptoms: Presence of both multiple enchondromas and osteochondroma-like lesions.
- Usual onset: Children (2–11 years)
- Causes: Mutations of PTPN11 gene (12q24)
- Differential diagnosis: Hereditary multiple osteochondromas (MO), Ollier disease, Maffucci syndrome, dysplasia epiphysealis hemimelica
- Treatment: Surgical intervention

Metachondromatosis is an autosomal dominant, incompletely penetrant genetic disease affecting the growth of bones, leading to exostoses primarily in the hands and feet as well as enchondromas of long bone metaphyses and iliac crests. This syndrome affects mainly tubular bones, though it can also involve the vertebrae, small joints, and flat bones. The disease is thought to affect exon 4 of the PTPN11 gene. Metachondromatosis is believed to be caused by an 11 base pair deletion resulting in a frameshift and nonsense mutation. The disease was discovered and named in 1971 by Pierre Maroteaux, a French physician, when he observed two families with skeletal radiologic features with exostoses and Ollier disease. The observation of one family with five affected people led to the identification of the disease as autosomal dominant. There have been less than 40 cases of the disease reported to date.

== Signs and symptoms ==
Metachondromatosis is identified by the presence of both multiple enchondromas and osteochondromas in the patient, although other less characteristic symptoms are often associated with the disease. The symptoms usually become apparent in the first 10 years of life and disappear later in life. The symptoms of Metachondromatosis are seen as follows:

=== Enchondromas ===
Enchondromas are benign tumors present on the inside of bones. In Metachondromatosis, enchondromas involves the iliac crests and metaphyses of long bones, often the proximal femur. Usually, these tumors are painless; however, when present in the hands or feet, or in multiple lesions, as typically seen, bone deformity can occur.

=== Osteochondromas ===
Osteochondromas are benign tumors located on the surface of bone near growth plates. These tumors also often in the hands and feet, primarily affecting the digits of fingers and toes. These tumors tend to subside after 10-20 years of life. These tumors can become painful if they pressure sensitive tissue or nerves. Metachondromatosis is differentiated from hereditary multiple osteochondromas by the location of the location of Osteochondromas tumors as well as the lack of bone-shortening.

=== Abnormality of epiphysis morphology ===
The epiphysis is the rounded end part of bone. The structure of the epiphysis can be abnormal in metachondromatosis.

=== Abnormality of the metaphysis ===
The metaphysis is wide portion of a long bone, and also has abnormal structure in the disease.

=== Avascular necrosis ===
Avascular necrosis is the death of bone due to a decreased blood supply.

=== Bone pain ===
People with metachondromatosis often experience bone pain due to abnormal bone shapes.

=== Cranial nerve paralysis ===
Cranial nerve paralysis can affect the functions associated with the cranial nerve.

== Genetics ==
Metachondromatosis is inherited in an autosomal dominant manner, needing only one copy of the defective gene to cause the disorder. The cause of the disorder has been linked to an 11 base pair deletion in exon four of the PTPN11 gene (12q24.13). This deletion causes a frameshift, resulting in a nonsense mutation with a premature stop codon. This causes severe truncation and loss of function in the gene's protein product, tyrosine phosphatase SHP-2.

SHP-2 plays an important role in regulating expression of the Indian Hedgehog gene (IHH), which is associated with differentiation in chondrocytes (specialized cells in cartilage tissue). Individuals affected by metachondromatosis generally demonstrate high levels of IHH expression, which is believed to be responsible for the tumor growth.

Given that the mutation causes a loss of protein function and displays a dominant inheritance pattern, it is hypothesized that individuals homozygous for the disorder would display greater symptoms than heterozygous individuals, though insufficient data is available to evaluate these claims due to the rarity of the disease. Conversely, some heterozygous individuals have shown minimal effects, leading to the disorder's designation as incompletely penetrant. The cause of this is not fully understood, but may be due to other factors influencing IHH expression.

== Diagnosis ==
Because of its rarity, metachondromatosis is often a difficult disease to recognize and diagnose. Diagnosis can be made based on clinical observations and radiographic findings as well as family history. Using radiographic methods, osteochondromas can be seen at the metaphyses of the short tubular bones, such as those in the hands and feet, pointing towards the joints. Enchondromas would also be visible along with the osteochondromas. The differential diagnosis includes hereditary multiple osteochondromas. This is a condition in which the long bones are primarily affected, and the lesions point away from the joint or growth plate. This may also result in the shortening or deformity of the affected bones. Since metachondromatosis is hereditary, genetic counseling can be offered to patients and their families. Some available genetic tests for metachondromatosis are sequence analysis of the entire coding region, targeted variant analysis, deletion/duplication analysis, and a sequence analysis of select exons associated with the disorder.

== Treatment ==
Osteochondromas are usually painless, and in many cases, they spontaneously regress after the first or second decade of life. Most patients are asymptomatic, making medical intervention unnecessary. However, in extreme cases such as severe malalignment of the fingers and toes, surgery can be used to remove the osteochondromas.

== Epidemiology ==
Metachondromatosis is very rare, occurring in less than 1 in 1,000,000 people. Fewer than 40 cases have been reported around the world to date.
