= Epiphyseal line =

Region of fusion between the head and neck of a long bone

An epiphyseal line is an epiphyseal plate that has become ossified. The process of it forming from an epiphyseal plate is named epiphyseal closure. In adult humans, it marks the point of fusion between the epiphysis and the metaphysis.

== Function ==
The epiphyseal line serves no function in the bone, being purely vestigial. However, it serves as an indicator of the boundary between the epiphysis and diaphysis.
