= Spondyloenchondrodysplasia =

- Other names: Spondyloenchondrodysplasia with immune dysregulation, Combined immunodeficiency with autoimmunity and spondylometaphyseal dysplasia, Roifman immunoskeletal syndrome, SPENCD (abbr.), SEM (abbr.), Spondylometaphyseal dysplasia with enchondromatous changes, Spondyloenchondromatosis
- Specialty: Medical genetics
- Symptoms: Vary widely among patients
- Usual onset: Birth–Childhood
- Duration: Lifelong
- Causes: Genetic mutation
- Frequency: rare

Spondyloenchondrodysplasia is the medical term for a rare spectrum of symptoms that are inherited following an autosomal recessive inheritance pattern. Skeletal anomalies (including abnormal bone growths) are the usual symptoms of the disorder, although its phenotypical nature is highly variable among patients with the condition, including symptoms such as muscle spasticity or thrombocytopenia purpura. It is a type of immunoosseous dysplasia.

== Signs and symptoms ==
Heterogeneity in this disorder causes the phenotype and severity of the symptoms caused by the disorder to vary widely among patients with the condition, these subsets of symptoms include those affecting the immune system (causing autoimmune diseases and resulting in the disruption of other systems such as the hematological one), the neurological system, and many more.

=== Skeletal symptoms ===
This condition primarily constitutes skeletal anomalies.

These include metaphyseal dysplasia, platyspondyly and the presence of lesions located in the long bones and the spinal vertebrae, and enchondroma.

=== Cartilage symptoms ===
This subset of symptoms affecting the cartilage.

They include the presence of enchondroma and the failure of cartilage to turn into bone in some parts of the body.

=== Immune symptoms ===
This subset of symptoms primarily affects the immune system (immunodeficiency) and also causes autoimmune diseases, which indirectly affect other systems of the body.

These include thrombocytopenia, rheumatoid arthritis, systemic lupus erythematosus, recurrent respiratory infections and fevers, hemolytic anemia, and hypothyroidism.

=== Neurological symptoms ===
This subset of symptoms affects the central nervous system.

These include ataxia, muscle spasticity, intellectual disabilities, and cerebral calcification.

=== Other findings ===
Other features that may be found in patients with this condition include short stature, dental eruption delay, dental malocclusion, vitiligo, seizures, pectus carinatum, kyphosis, kyphoscoliosis, ventriculomegaly, vasculitis, Raynaud's phenomenon, pain affecting the lower limbs, chronic headaches, chronic kidney disease, cranio-facial dysmorphisms, hypoplasia of the iliac bones, lupus nephritis, arthralgia, arthritis, hypocomplementemia, low to absent TRAP enzyme in serum, high levels of interferon-alpha in the serum, and an over-expression of interferon-stimulated genes.

Rare symptoms include intellectual disability, developmental delay, progressive spastic quadriplegia, temporomandibular joint pain, hepatosplenomegaly, and spina bifida.

=== Complications ===
Premature death may result from the immunodeficiency and/or autoimmunity associated with this condition.

== Genetics ==
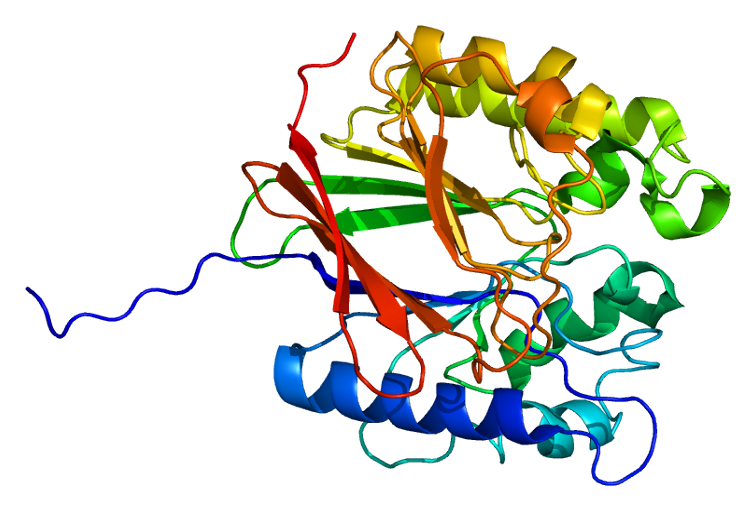
The tartrate-resistant acid phosphatase enzyme, encoded by the ACP5 gene.

This condition is caused by autosomal recessive loss-of-function mutations in the ACP5 gene, located in chromosome 19. This gene encodes an iron-containing enzyme known as tartrate-resistant acid phosphatase, which regulates a protein known as osteopontin. Immune system cells is among the many systems this protein plays a role in.

Individuals with this condition have over-active osteopontin protein due to the fact that the TRAP enzyme is unable of inactivating it. The impaired TRAP enzyme is a result of the ACP5 mutation involved with the condition. Osteopontin hyperactivity in patients with spondyloenchondroplasia results in over-produced interferon 1 protein, a bone breakdown process that is longer than usual and an unusually over-active immune system. Both of these altered mechanisms cause skeletal anomalies, autoimmunity, and immunodeficiency as a result.

In rare cases, spondyloenchondroplasia may be inherited in an autosomal dominant manner.

== Diagnosis ==
There are various ways of diagnosing spondyloenchondroplasia:

=== Physical examination ===
Description of physical findings in patients with spondyloenchondroplasia is essential for a proper diagnosis. The most common physical finding is short stature.

The four patients described by Frydman et al. (1986) had a stature that was three standard deviations below average.

The two Turkish siblings with the condition reported by De Bruin et al. (2016) had extreme short stature.

=== Radiographs ===
All cases in the medical literature of spondyloenchondroplasia have included a description of the adiological anomalies shown by patients with the condition which were found on radiographs.

A 5-year-old Indian boy reported by Kulkarni et al. (2007) had anomalies of his metaphyses and vertebrae bones which were visible under X-ray. These are common skeletal features shared by patients with spondyloenchondroplasia.

Two brothers born of a consanguineous first-cousin Iraqi Jewish union had enchondromatosis which was visible under radiographs.

One of the four patients analyzed by Menger et al. (1989) had vertebral anomalies that were visible on radiographs. Said patient was the product of father-daughter incest.

Uhlmann et al. (1998) found spinal anomalies, flattened bones, and tubular enchondromas in 2 boys with the condition which were visible on radiographs.

=== Genetic testing ===
Genetic testing methods are essential for a diagnosis of spondyloenchondroplasia, said diagnostic methods must detect a mutation in the ACP5 gene of the patient with the condition.

Girschick et al. (2015) found a missense mutation and a 1 base pair duplication in the ACP5 gene of a 9-year-old girl with the condition. Both mutations were homozygous. Her parents were heterozygous for only one of the mutations.

Genetic testing done on the 5-year-old Indian boy reported by Kulkarni et al. (2007) showed a 5-kb deletion in his ACP5 gene, present in a homozygous state.

Lausch et al. (2011) found a mutation in the ACP5 gene of 5 families with the condition after performing targeted genetic sequencing (at ACP5) on them.

Sema et al. (2021) found a homozygous mutation (c.155A > C) in the ACP5 gene of a 19-year-old Turkish man with the condition.

Among the many patients in the study, Briggs et al. (2011) found a homozygous C>T substitution in exon 4 of the ACP5 gene of two Turkish siblings of the opposite sex which lead to a threonine to isoleucine substitution at amino acid position 89 of the gene. The mutation was found thanks to genetic sequencing.

=== Laboratory studies ===
Various biochemical anomalies can be found in patients with the condition through laboratory studies.

The affected 9-year-old girl and her unaffected parents reported by Girschick et al. (2015) had levels of TRAP enzyme lower than average in their blood.

An Egyptian girl reported by Briggs et al. (2011) was found to have antinuclear antibody, anti-dsDNA antibody titers, microglobulinemia, and hypogammaglobulinemia.

Hermann et al. reported a 9-year-old German girl with the condition, laboratory tests done on her showed high levels of interferon-α in her cerebrospinal fluid and serum, abnormal results from liver function tests, IcG, decreased levels of CD4+ cells, B cells, and natural killer cells, and the presence of autoantibodies.

=== Differential diagnosis ===
Conditions that might be confused with spondyloenchodroplasia include:

- Metachondromatosis, a rare autosomal dominant genetic disorder characterized by metaphyseal enchondromas and exostoses of the hands and feet.
- Genochondromatosis, a very rare autosomal dominant genetic disorder characterized by humeral and femural enchondromas which don't cause short stature.
- Dysspondylochondromatosis
- Pseudoachondroplasia, a rare autosomal dominant genetic disorder characterized by disproportionate short stature, waddling gait, ligamentous laxity, short fingers and various other radiological anomalies, including (but not limited to) abnormally late-onset epiphyseal ossification and lumbar lordosis.

== Treatment ==
Although no standard management strategy for spondyloenchondroplasia exists, there have been various treatment methods done on patients with the condition reported in the medical literature.

=== Growth hormone therapy ===
The 21-year-old sister of the proband reported by Tuyzus et al. (2004) had undergone growth hormone therapy 12 years prior to the study in order to treat her severely short stature.

Takanori et al. (2017) described successful treatment for spondyloenchondroplasia-associated short stature with growth hormone therapy on a child with the condition.

=== Methylprednisolone pulse therapy ===
The German girl reported by Hermann et al. underwent methylprednisolone pulse therapy, which later lessened the severity of her muscle spasticity.

=== Mycophenolate mofetil ===
The aforementioned German girl was prescribed with a 250 mg daily dose of mycophenolate mofetil which later improved her motor function and her blood platelet count.

=== Prednisolone ===
After a hospitalization at the age of 5 years old as a result of a sudden onset of clinical symptoms including bloody diarrhea, a high fever, pneumonia, and polyarthritis, the aforementioned girl was prescribed a 20 mg daily dose of prednisolone, which later improved her symptoms.

=== Baricitinib ===
Masaki et al. (2020) described an 8-year-old girl with Turner syndrome (46, X, idic(X) (p11.2) [55%]/45, XX [45%] karyotype) and spondyloenchondroplasia. She was treated with growth hormone therapy at first but it barely treated her short stature. She was then given a prescription for a daily dose of prednisolone and mycophenolate mofetil, and while said prescription improved some of her symptoms, her recurrent fevers and headaches didn't stop, she was then prescribed a 2–4 mg daily dose of baricitinib, the latter medication significantly improved her serum ferritin levels and her IFN score. She faced no side effects from this medication.

== Prevalence ==
According to OMIM, only around 30–40 cases have been described in the medical literature.

== History ==
=== Discovery of the disorder ===
This condition was first described in 2003 by Roifman et al., the amount of patients they described was four.

The first two patients were a pair of siblings of the opposite sex (brother and sister) born to consanguineous first-cousin Portuguese parents. The sister was noted to have suffered from various health complications, including recurrent infections (primarily those affecting the respiratory system), chronic restrictive lung disease, idiopathic thrombocytopenic purpura, and an enlarged thyroid accompanied by hypothyroidism. Her thrombocytopenic purpura didn't resolve with the use of either prednisone or intravenous immunoglobulin, but it did after a splenectomy was performed on her. The younger brother had presumably died, and had suffered from various ailments like her sister, including recurrent respiratory infections, campylobacter enteritis, idiopathic thrombocytopenic purpura, and encephalitis, the latter of which caused his aforementioned death.

The other 2 patients constituted of a 5-year-old boy who suffered from recurrent respiratory infections, hemorrhagic chickenpox, and idiopathic thrombocytopenic purpura. The fourth and final case was that of a 10-year-old-boy who had recurrent infections, Crohn's disease, and hypothyroidism.

=== Discovery of the disorder's molecular basis ===
The gene involved in spondyloenchondroplasia was found in 2011 by Briggs et al., their study included 10 participants with the condition from 8 families worldwide. Homozygosity mapping in the patients linked the 19p13 region of the 19th chromosome to the disorder. Further genetic analysis showed mutations in the ACP5 gene. Of these 10 patients, half were born to consanguineous parents and half were not, although genetic analysis on one pair of seemingly unrelated parents gave the possibility that they were distantly related.

== See also ==
- Achondroplasia
- Achondrogenesis
- Autosomal recessive multiple epiphyseal dysplasia
- Osteochondrodysplasia
