= Ossification center =

Place where cartilage is replaced with bone

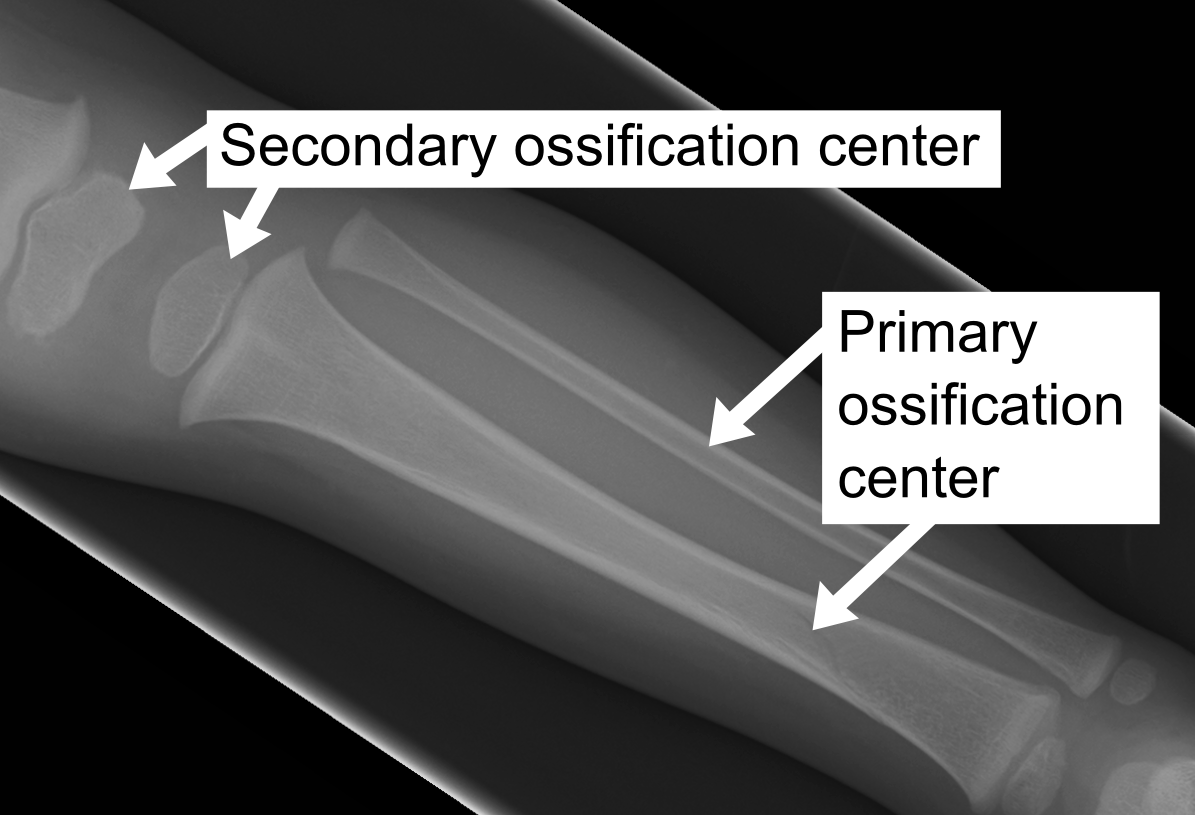
- X-ray of ossification centers in a young child.

Details

Identifiers
- Latin: centrum ossificationis
- TA98: A02.0.00.043
- TA2: 403
- FMA: 75436

An ossification center is a point where ossification of the hyaline cartilage begins. The first step in ossification is that the chondrocytes at this point become hypertrophic and arrange themselves in rows.

The matrix in which they are imbedded increases in quantity, so that the cells become further separated from each other.

A deposit of calcareous material now takes place in this matrix, between the rows of cells, so that they become separated from each other by longitudinal columns of calcified matrix, presenting a granular and opaque appearance.

Here and there the matrix between two cells of the same row also becomes calcified, and transverse bars of calcified substance stretch across from one calcareous column to another.

Thus, there are longitudinal groups of the cartilage cells enclosed in oblong cavities, the walls of which are formed of calcified matrix which cuts off all nutrition from the cells; the cells, in consequence, atrophy, leaving spaces called the primary areolæ.

== Types of ossification centers ==
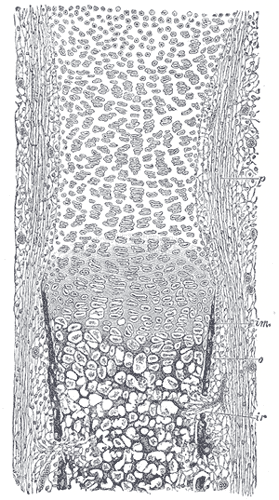
Section of fetal bone of cat. ir. Irruption of the subperiosteal tissue. p. Fibrous layer of the periosteum. o. Layer of osteoblasts. im. Subperiosteal bony deposit.

There are two types of ossification centers – primary and secondary.

A primary ossification center is the first area of a bone to start ossifying. It usually appears during prenatal development in the central part of each developing bone. In long bones the primary centers occur in the diaphysis/shaft and in irregular bones the primary centers occur usually in the body of the bone. Most bones have only one primary center (e.g. all long bones except clavicle) but some irregular bones such as the os coxae (hip) and vertebrae have multiple primary centers.

A secondary ossification center is the area of ossification that appears after the primary ossification center has already appeared – most of which appear during the postnatal and adolescent years. Most bones have more than one secondary ossification center. In long bones, the secondary centers appear in the epiphyses. At the end of the formation of the secondary ossification center, the only two areas where the cartilage remains is at the articular cartilage covering the epiphysis and at the epiphyseal plate between the epiphysis and diaphysis.

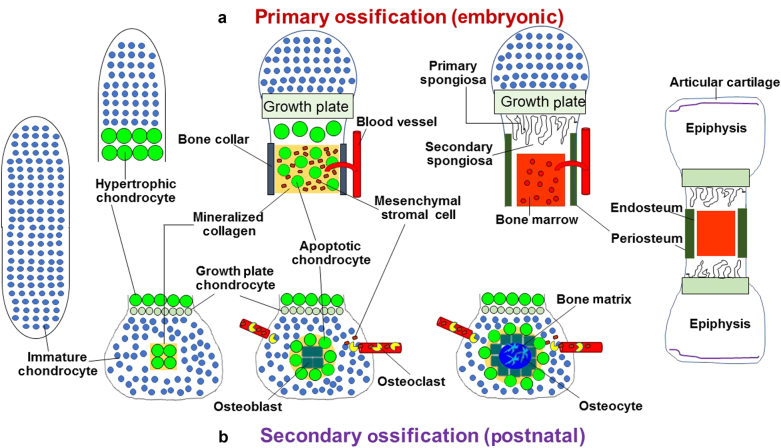
A schematic for long bone endochondral ossification: 1. Primary endochondral ossification begins with the formation of a chondrocyte template. Afterwards, chondrocytes undergo hypertrophy beginning from the mid-diaphysis, eventually extending to the epiphyseal poles, vasculature invades the forming bone transporting mesenchymal stromal cells and hypertrophic cells undergo apoptosis. Mesenchymal stromal cells differentiate into osteoblasts and then osteocytes.; 2. Secondary ossification occurs at the epiphysis post-natally and bone formation initiates at the center and extends peripherally.

== Bibliography ==
- Gray, Henry; Spitzka, Edward Anthony (1910). Anatomy, descriptive and applied. the University of California: Lea & Febiger. p. 44. "ossification."
