= Bone sarcoma =

Malignant tumor that grows within a bone

- Specialty: Oncology

A bone sarcoma is a primary malignant bone tumour, a type of sarcoma that starts in the bones. This is in contrast to most bone cancers that are secondary having developed as a metastasis from another cancer. Bone sarcomas are rare, and mostly affect the legs. The other type of sarcoma is a soft-tissue sarcoma.

There are three main types of bone sarcoma based on tissue type – an osteosarcoma, a Ewing's sarcoma, and a chondrosarcoma.

== Main types ==
The three main types of bone sarcoma are an osteosarcoma, most frequently found of the three; Ewing's sarcoma, and a chondrosarcoma. There are many subtypes within each of these neoplasms.

=== Osteosarcoma ===
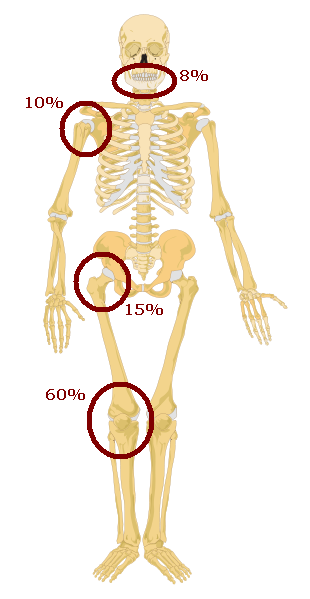
Favoured sites for the development of an osteosarcoma

An osteosarcoma is predominantly found in childhood and adolescence. They are primarily found in long bones, and may be secondary tumours. Osteosarcomas are composed of mesenchymal cells that produce immature bone. The tumour cells are unique in that they produce immature osteoid.

=== Ewing's sarcoma ===
Ewing's sarcoma is the next most commonly found sarcoma in adolescents and young adults. Ewing's is highly aggressive, typically developing from the medullary cavity of a bone with cells invading the Haversian system. An immunohistochemistry test shows the tumour as having small rounded blue cells. The cells express high levels of CD99.

=== Chondrosarcoma ===
A chondrosarcoma is the type of bone cancer that starts in the cartilage cells. It is the most common type found in adults. Unlike the other types it is rarely found in those under the age of twenty. Most chondrosarcomas develop in the pelvis, legs or arms. Benign counterparts are known as enchondromas. Chondrosarcomas are classified by grade as a measurement of their growth rate – I, II, and III. The lower the grade the slower the rate of growth. Grade III are the most aggressive, and are liable to spread.

Subtypes of chondrosarcomas have different features and different outlooks, they include:

Dedifferentiated
Dedifferentiated chondrosarcomas can change in part to cells that are like those of an osteosarcoma for example which has a faster rate of growth. The role of chemotherapy in this subtype remains controversial.
Clear cell
Clear cell chondrosarcomas are rare, slow-growing, and seldom spread.
Mesenchymal
Mesenchymal chondrosarcomas can grow quickly this subtype represents the highest response rate to conventional chemotherapy. Moreover, mesenchymal subtype is commonly seen in young individuals, therefore chemotherapy is commonly better tolerated. They have densely packed small round blue cells like those in Ewing's sarcoma. Type II collagen can help distinguish it from other tumours.
