= List of radiographic findings associated with cutaneous conditions =

Many conditions of or affecting the human integumentary system have associated features that may be found by performing an x-ray or CT scan of the affected person.

Radiographic findings associated with conditions of or affecting the human integumentary system
Finding	Condition(s)
Osteopathia striata	Goltz syndrome
Osteopoikilosis	Buschke–Ollendorff syndrome
Polyostotic fibrous dysplasia	McCune–Albright syndrome
Osteodystrophy	Albright's hereditary osteodystrophy
Chondrodysplasia punctata	Conradi–Hünermann syndrome
Dyschondroplasia	Maffucci syndrome
Enchondroma	Maffucci syndrome Ollier disease
Tufted phalanges	Hypohidrotic ectodermal dysplasia
Achondroplasia	Cartilage–hair hypoplasia
Metaphyseal widening	Menkes kinky hair syndrome
Long bone spurs	Menkes kinky hair syndrome
Absent patella	Nail–patella syndrome
Radial head subluxation	Nail–patella syndrome
Posterior iliac horns	Nail–patella syndrome
Intervertebral disk calcification	Alkaptonuria
Erlenmeyer flask deformity of the femur	Gaucher syndrome
Absent thymus	Severe combined immunodeficiency (SCID); DiGeorge syndrome Nezelof syndrome
Osteoporosis	Reflex sympathetic dystrophy
Osteoarthritis	Myxoid cyst
Exostosis	Proteus syndrome
Scoliosis	Ichthyosis hystrix Neurofibromatosis type 1 Proteus syndrome
Distal phalangeal radiolucency	Incontinentia pigmenti
Absent radius	Rothmund–Thomson syndrome
Periostosis of long bones	Pachydermoperiostosis
Tram-track calcifications	Sturge–Weber syndrome
Osteogenic jaw cyst	Gorlin syndrome
Sphenoid wing dysplasia	Neurofibromatosis type 1
Stippled epiphyses	Conradi–Hünermann syndrome
Bifid rib	Gorlin syndrome
Melorheostosis	Linear morphea
Bilateral intracranial sickle-shaped calcifications of the temporal lobes	Lipoid proteinosis

== See also ==
- List of cutaneous conditions
- List of contact allergens
- List of cutaneous conditions associated with internal malignancy
- List of cutaneous conditions caused by mutations in keratins
- List of cutaneous conditions caused by problems with junctional proteins
- List of genes mutated in cutaneous conditions
- List of histologic stains that aid in diagnosis of cutaneous conditions
- List of immunofluorescence findings for autoimmune bullous conditions
- List of inclusion bodies that aid in diagnosis of cutaneous conditions
- List of keratins expressed in the human integumentary system
- List of specialized glands within the human integumentary system
- List of target antigens in pemphigoid
- List of target antigens in pemphigus
