= Spondylometaphyseal dysplasia, East-African type =

Spondylometaphyseal dysplasia, East African type
- Other names: SMD, East African type
- Specialty: Medical genetics
- Symptoms: Bone abnormalities
- Usual onset: Birth
- Duration: Life-long
- Prevention: none
- Prognosis: Ok-Good
- Frequency: very rare, only 2 cases have been reported in medical literature
- Deaths: -

Spondylometaphyseal dysplasia, East-African type is a rare genetic disorder which is characterized by skeletal abnormalities involving the vertebrae and the metaphysis. Only two isolated cases have been reported.

== Description ==
People with this disorder usually have the following symptoms:

- Severe early-onset metaphyseal dysplasia which makes the metaphyses have the shape of a bracket
- Pelvis dysplasia
- Oval-shaped vertebrae

== Etiology ==
This disorder was first discovered in 2002, by Verloes et al, when they described two un-related patients from East Africa, both of them had additional features such as short-limbed short stature, brachydactyly, etc. to be more specific, one child came from healthy un-related Rwandan parents and the other child came from healthy un-related parents from Madagascar. They concluded that the patients did not have SMD type A4, but rather a brand new type of SMD.
