= Epiphysiodesis =

- ICD-9-CM: 78.2

Epiphysiodesis is a pediatric orthopedic surgery procedure that aims at altering or stopping the bone growth naturally occurring through the growth plate also known as the physeal plate. There are two types of epiphysiodesis: temporary hemiepiphysiodesis and permanent epiphysiodesis. Temporary hemiepiphysiodesis is also known as guided growth surgery or growth modulation surgery. Temporary hemiepiphysiodesis is reversible i.e. the metal implants used to achieve epiphysiodesis can be removed after the desired correction is achieved and the growth plate can thus resume its normal growth and function. In contrast, permanent epiphysiodesis is irreversible and the growth plate function cannot be restored after surgery. Both temporary hemiepiphysiodesis and permanent epiphysiodesis are used to treat a diverse array of pediatric orthopedic disorders but the exact indications for each procedure are different.

== Guided growth temporary hemiepiphysiodesis ==
Temporary hemiepiphysiodesis is widely used to treat angular or coronal plane deformities around the knee in children i.e. deformities occurring in the medial/lateral plane as genu varum/ genu valgum. Additionally, it has been used to treat sagittal plane deformities i.e. deformities arising the anterior/posterior plane. Temporary hemiepiphysiodesis has also been used to treat deformities around the hips and ankles and in the upper extremity growth plates such as the distal radius growth plate. Temporary hemiepiphysiodesis works through arresting or inhibiting the physeal growth at one hemi-side of the growth plate. In consequence the other hemi-side is allowed to grow normally and unhindered. This process occurs gradually and steadily and eventually leads to correction of the angular deformity in most cases. Temporary hemiepiphysiodesis or guided growth surgery has been used to treat angular deformities in children with diverse bone and joint disorders such as rickets, Blount's disease, osteochondrodysplasias, arthrogryposis multiplex congenita, idiopathic, trauma, and renal osteodystrophy among others. Temporary hemiepiphysiodesis is increasingly been viewed as more simple and efficient alternative to the classic time-honored osteotomy or bone cutting practice. Bone osteotomy achieve deformity correction immediately while temporary hemiepiphysiodesis does so gradually. A variety of metal implants have been used to perform temporary hemiepiphysiodesis or guided growth surgery as a two-hole plate and screws and staples. Figure 1 Any metal implant originally used to achieve temporary hemiepiphysiodesis should be removed once the intended deformity correction is reached. Otherwise the child will go into the reverse deformity, a phenomenon known as overcorrection. For example, failure to remove the metal implant in due time for a child that was being treated for a genu varum can result in overcorrection to a genu valgum deformity and vice versa.

=== Outcome and complications ===
Generally, the results of temporary hemiepiphysiodesis or guided growth surgery are satisfactory. In contrast to osteotomy or external fixation correction, it is considered as a less traumatic and safe surgical method. The complications are of low profile in terms of severity and frequency generally. Yet, there are concerns about the use of temporary hemiepiphysiodesis in certain diseases as Blount's disease and osteochondrodysplasias. Mechanical failure of the metal implant as plate and screws and failure to achieve full correction of the deformity has been closely associated with the Blount's disease. Additionally, recurrence of bone deformity or rebound phenomenon and subsequent repeated surgeries has been closely linked to bone deformities arising from osteochondrodysplasias. Generally, children should be followed up for deformity recurrence or rebound after removal of the metal implant used to achieve deformity correction.

== Permanent epiphysiodesis ==
=== Outcome and complications ===
The procedure must be performed for an appropriate duration during the patient's adolescent growth phase so that the limbs are near-equal in length by the end of skeletal growth. Poor timing can lead to a length mismatch, resulting in poor outcomes and significant patient morbidity.
