= Blount's disease =

- Other names: Tibia vara
- Specialty: Pediatrics, Orthopedics
- Symptoms: Lateral knee thrust during standing, bowleg
- Usual onset: Childhood
- Causes: Mechanical compression forces on the tibia
- Risk factors: Obesity, early walking, Black ancestry
- Diagnostic method: X-ray
- Differential diagnosis: Physiologic genu varum; Rickets
- Treatment: Bracing; surgery

Blount's disease (or Blount disease) is a progressive growth disorder of the tibia (shin bone) which causes the lower leg to angle inward, resembling a bowleg. It is also known as "tibia vara".

== Classifications ==
Classification of Blount's disease is determined by age at onset:

- Infantile: presents before 4 years of age
- Adolescent: presents at or after 10 years of age.

The distinguishing feature of the infantile form is early involvement of the growth plate, progressing to asymmetric and permanent epiphysiodesis (stopping of bone growth).

Some reports additionally describe a juvenile (4-10 years old) form, though such cases can also be classified as neglected or recurrent infantile form.

== Signs and symptoms ==
The primary symptom of Blount's disease is progressive bowing of the leg. The infantile form typically presents with bowing of both legs, whereas the adolescent form usually presents with bowing on one side. Children may laterally thrust their knee while standing. Limited hip or knee mobility and a limp may also be present.

Pain is generally rare in the infantile form. In contrast, the adolescent form is associated with hip or medial knee pain.

If Blount disease is left uncorrected, it usually progresses. Blount disease leads to progressive bowleg deformity, unequal leg lengths, and early arthritis of the knee.. The infantile form may progress to permanent epiphysiodesis.

== Causes ==
Blount disease is caused by multiple factors, including mechanical force and genetics.

=== Mechanical force ===
Excessive mechanical compressive forces on the tibia is a significant contributor to the development of this condition. These forces may be caused by extreme child obesity (BMI ≥ 40) or early walking in childhood.. Early walking (before 10 months of age) is common among those with infantile Blount disease.

=== Genetics, ethnicity, and socioeconomics ===
Black ancestry is a significant risk factor in the United States and Caribbean for the development of Blount disease. The reason for this increased risk is poorly understood, and may suggest a genetic contribution to disease development.

Socioeconomic factors may also contribute to the increased risk among Black populations. A study of 125 patients with Blount disease in the United States found that Black patients had significantly higher BMI, lower household incomes, and higher Medicaid enrollment than non-Black patients, which may contribute to disease progression and delay of treatment.

== Pathophysiology ==
Blount disease is an acquired growth disorder. A prevailing hypothesis is that disease develops in genetically susceptible patients that experience excessive compression forces on the tibia. Compressive forces cause damage to cartilage and delay bone maturation. These changes lead to loss in medial tibial bone growth at the growth plate. Greater muscle exertion is needed to stabilize the force, and children adapt by laterally thrusting their knee. This adaptation creates the bowleg appearance.

== Diagnosis ==
Diagnosis of Blount disease is based on X-ray from hip to ankle, which will show decreased bone growth at the medial tibial growth plate. Other X-ray findings suggestive of Blount's disease include medial beaking of the epiphysis, widened and irregular medial physis, irregular ossification, and medial slope of the epiphysis and metaphysis in varus. Specific angle measurements on X-ray, such as the metaphyseal-diaphyseal angle (MDA), can assess Blount's disease in children.

=== Langenskiöld Classification System ===
The Langenskiöld Classification System is a X-ray-based 6-stage diagrammatic system to assess Blount's disease Higher grades are associated with greater deformity.

The 6 stages are as follows:

- Stage I: The metaphyseal zone develops early irregularities.
- Stage II: A beak-like projection begins forming on the medial aspect of the metaphysis.
- Stage III: The medial metaphyseal beak develops a step-shaped deformity.
- Stage IV: The epiphysis itself becomes beaked and comes to sit within a depression in the medial metaphysis.
- Stage V: The epiphyseal growth plate takes on a bifid appearance.
- Stage VI: An osseous bridge forms across the growth plate.

=== Differential diagnosis ===
The most common cause of bowlegs in infants and toddlers is physiologic and will self-correct with time. Bowing that persists one year after walking begins or 3 years of age may require further evaluation.

Rickets can produce leg deformities that closely mimic those produced by Blount's disease. To differentiate between rickets and Blount's disease, it is important to identify nutrition status and risk factors.

Osteochondrodysplasias or genetic bone diseases can cause leg deformities similar to Blount's disease. The clinical appearance and the characteristic X-ray findings are important to confirm the diagnosis.

== Treatment ==
=== Bracing ===
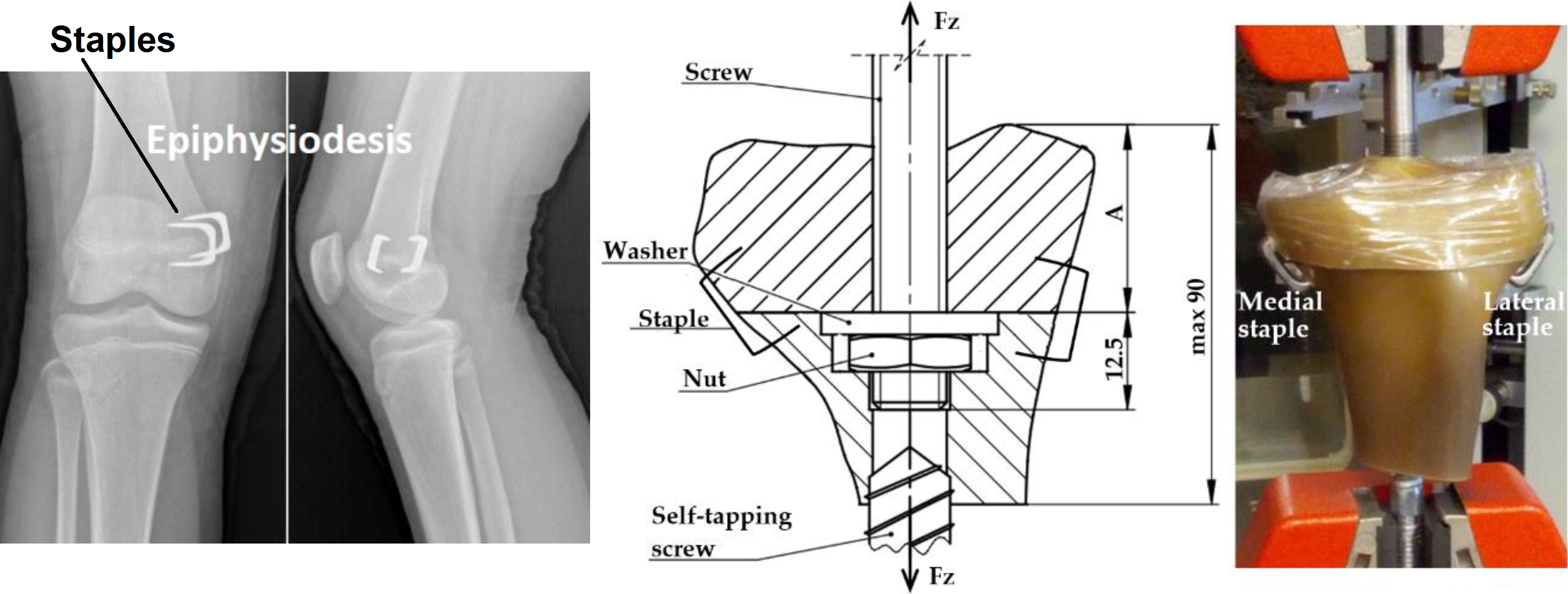
Staples for epiphysiodesis in the bone, Blount's disease treatment - rtg. snapshots and biomechanical experiments

Treatment is determined by age and severity. Children who develop severe bowing before the age of 4 and have Langenskiöld stage I or II disease may be treated with Knee-Ankle-Foot Orthoses (KAFOs). However, there is no consensus that bracing is necessary or effective. Bracing is most likely to be successful if started before age 3 in non-obese children.

=== Surgery ===
Surgery is recommended in children over 4 years old with X-ray findings. Early surgery can prevent further progression of the disease and permanent deformity. Once the growth plate is damaged, repeated surgery is the only treatment option for Blount's disease. Common surgical approaches include hemiepiphysiodesis (guided growth) and osteotomy (bone surgery).

Hemiepiphysiodesis, also known as guided growth, is recommended in children over 4 years old with immature skeletons. Staples, pins, or tension bands are used to correct bowleg deformity progressively over time. Guided growth causes less pain for patients than osteotomy. Additionally, guided growth is associated with shorter recovery times and reduced surgical risks.

Osteotomy is recommended in children over 3-4 years old, particularly those with neglected cases. The goal of osteotomy is the reduce force on the medial tibia, or inside of the shin bone, to allow for normal bone growth. Slight overcorrection is done to prevent disease recurrence, and will resolve with time. The correction can be done all at once or gradually, with weak evidence favoring gradual correction.

== Associated conditions ==
Blount disease is one of the 8 severe comorbidities of severe obesity (BMI >35), which are an indication for bariatric surgery in children per a 2019 policy statement of the American Academy of Pediatrics. The other severe comorbidities are:

- obstructive sleep apnea
- type 2 diabetes mellitus
- idiopathic intracranial hypertension
- nonalcoholic steatohepatitis
- slipped capital femoral epiphysis
- gastroesophageal reflux disease
- hypertension.

== Etymology ==
Blount disease is named after Walter Putnam Blount (1900–1992), an American pediatric orthopedic surgeon who described it in 1937.

The disease has also been known as Mau-Nilsonne syndrome, after C. Mau and H. Nilsonne, who published early case reports of the condition.
