= Immunohistochemistry test =

The immunohistochemistry (IHC) test is a laboratory method that detects antibodies of prions (mis-shapen proteins thought to transmit bovine spongiform encephalopathy, BSE or mad cow disease) by exposing a brain sample to a stain that appears as a specific color under a microscope.

The IHC test is used by USDA researchers in their BSE surveillance program because they consider it the gold standard, providing a high level of confidence about the results. However, IHC tests are expensive and time-consuming. More rapid and less expensive testing alternatives (“rapid tests”) have been used in some other countries, but until recently USDA has viewed them as less reliable because they can deliver more false positive and/or false negative results than the IHC. However, in June 2004 USDA embarked on a greatly expanded BSE testing program to test more than 200,000 cattle over a 12-18 month period (compared with 20,000 in each of 2002 and 2003). It is now using rapid test kits at regional laboratories to conduct initial screening; any samples that test “positive” for BSE (which USDA terms “inconclusive”) must be subjected to an IHC test for confirmation.
