= Epiphyseal plate =

Cartilage plate in the neck of a long bone

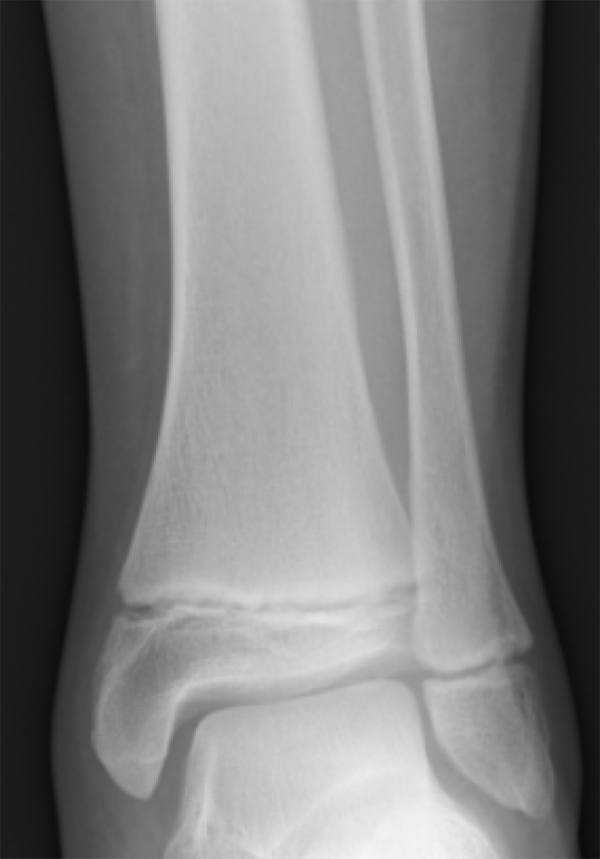
- Radiogram of distal tibia (left) and fibula (right) showing two epiphyseal plates

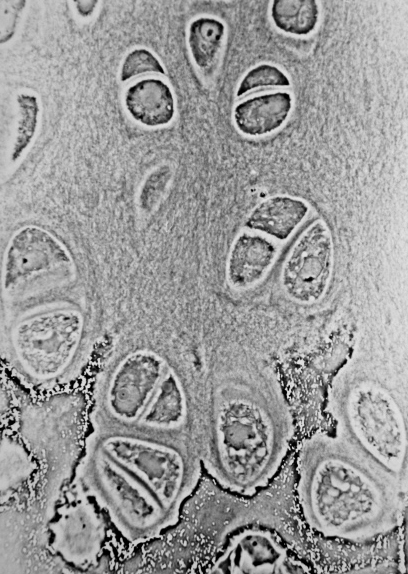
- Light micrograph of an undecalcified epiphyseal plate that is displaying the hypertrophic zone with its typical chondrocytes, matrix and three zones: maturation (top), degenerative (middle) and provisional calcification (bottom).

Details

Identifiers
- Latin: lamina epiphysialis
- MeSH: D006132
- TA98: A02.0.00.020
- TA2: 395
- FMA: 75427

The epiphyseal plate, epiphysial plate, physis, or growth plate is a hyaline cartilage plate in the metaphysis at each end of a long bone. It is the part of a long bone where new bone growth takes place; that is, the whole bone is alive, with maintenance remodeling throughout its existing bone tissue, but the growth plate is the place where the long bone grows longer (adds length).

The plate is only found in children and adolescents; in adults, who have stopped growing, the plate is replaced by an epiphyseal line. This replacement is known as epiphyseal closure or growth plate fusion. Complete fusion can occur as early as 12 for girls (with the most common being 14–15 years for girls) and as early as 14 for boys (with the most common being 15–17 years for boys).

== Structure ==
=== Development ===
Endochondral ossification is responsible for the initial bone development from cartilage in utero and infants and the longitudinal growth of long bones in the epiphyseal plate. The plate's chondrocytes are under constant division by mitosis. These daughter cells stack facing the epiphysis while the older cells are pushed towards the diaphysis. As the older chondrocytes degenerate, osteoblasts ossify the remains to form new bone. In puberty increasing levels of estrogen, in both females and males, leads to increased apoptosis of chondrocytes in the epiphyseal plate. Depletion of chondrocytes due to apoptosis leads to less ossification, with growth slowing down and later stopping when the entire cartilage has been replaced by bone, leaving only a thin epiphyseal scar which later disappears.

=== Histology ===
The growth plate has a very specific morphology in having a zonal arrangement as follows:

Epiphyseal plate zone (from epiphysis to diaphysis)	Description
Zone of reserve	Quiescent chondrocytes are found at the epiphyseal end
Zone of proliferation	Chondrocytes undergo rapid mitosis under influence of growth hormone
Zone of maturation and hypertrophy	Chondrocytes stop mitosis, and begin to hypertrophy by accumulating glycogen, lipids, and alkaline phosphatase
Zone of calcification	Chondrocytes undergo apoptosis. Cartilagenous matrix begins to calcify.
Zone of ossification	Osteoclasts and osteoblasts from the diaphyseal side break down the calcified cartilage and replace with mineralized bone tissue.

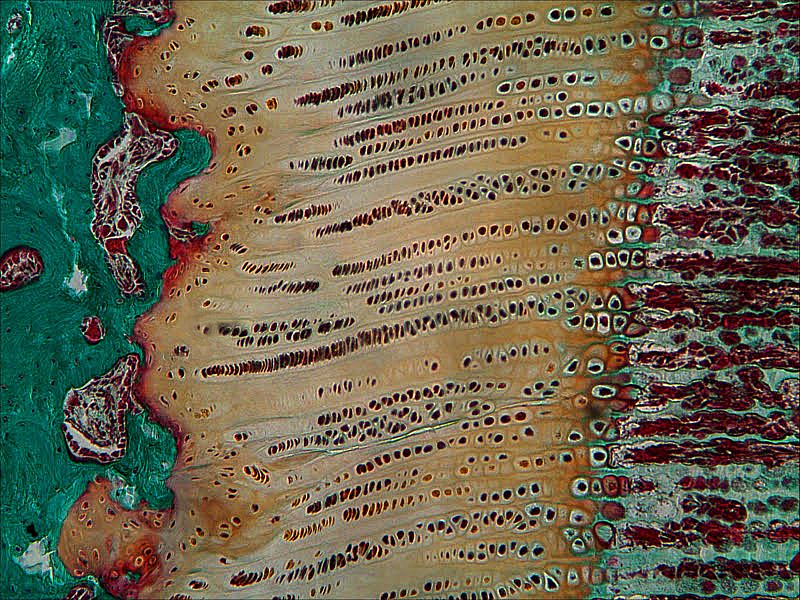
Masson Goldner trichrome stain of rabbit epiphysial plate

== Clinical significance ==
Defects in the development and continued division of epiphyseal plates can lead to growth disorders collectively known as osteochondrodysplasia. The most common defect is achondroplasia, where there is a defect in cartilage formation. Achondroplasia is the most common cause of dwarfism or short stature and it also manifests in generalized deformities of bones and joints. However, various other types of osteochondrodysplasias can cause short stature and generalized deformities of bones and joints due to abnormal function of growth plate cartilage cells. Hereditary multiple exostoses is a genetic condition that is caused by growth irregularities of the epiphyseal plates of the long bones of the upper and lower limbs. It usually results in limb deformities and a certain degree of functional limitations.

Salter–Harris fractures are fractures involving epiphyseal plates and hence tend to interfere with growth, height or physiologic functions.

Osgood–Schlatter disease results from stress on the epiphyseal plate in the tibia, leading to excess bone growth and a painful lump at the knee.

There are important clinical implications of the growth plate physiology. For example guided growth surgery, also known as temporary hemiepiphysiodesis is used to achieve correction or straightening of the bone deformities in a variety of pediatric orthopedic disorders such as Blount's disease, rickets, arthrogryposis multiplex congenita and osteochondrodysplasias among others. This applies to bone and joint deformities in the coronal – medial/lateral – plane or genu varum/genu valgum plane and in the sagittal – anterior/posterior – plane or knee flexion deformity/genu recurvatum plane.

== Other animals ==
John Hunter studied growing chickens, and observed that bones grew at the ends, demonstrating the existence of the epiphyseal plates. Hunter is often considered the "father of the growth plate" because of his early research on growth plates.

== See also ==
- Human development (biology)
- Salter–Harris fracture
