= Epiphysis =

End of a long bone that ossifies from a secondary center

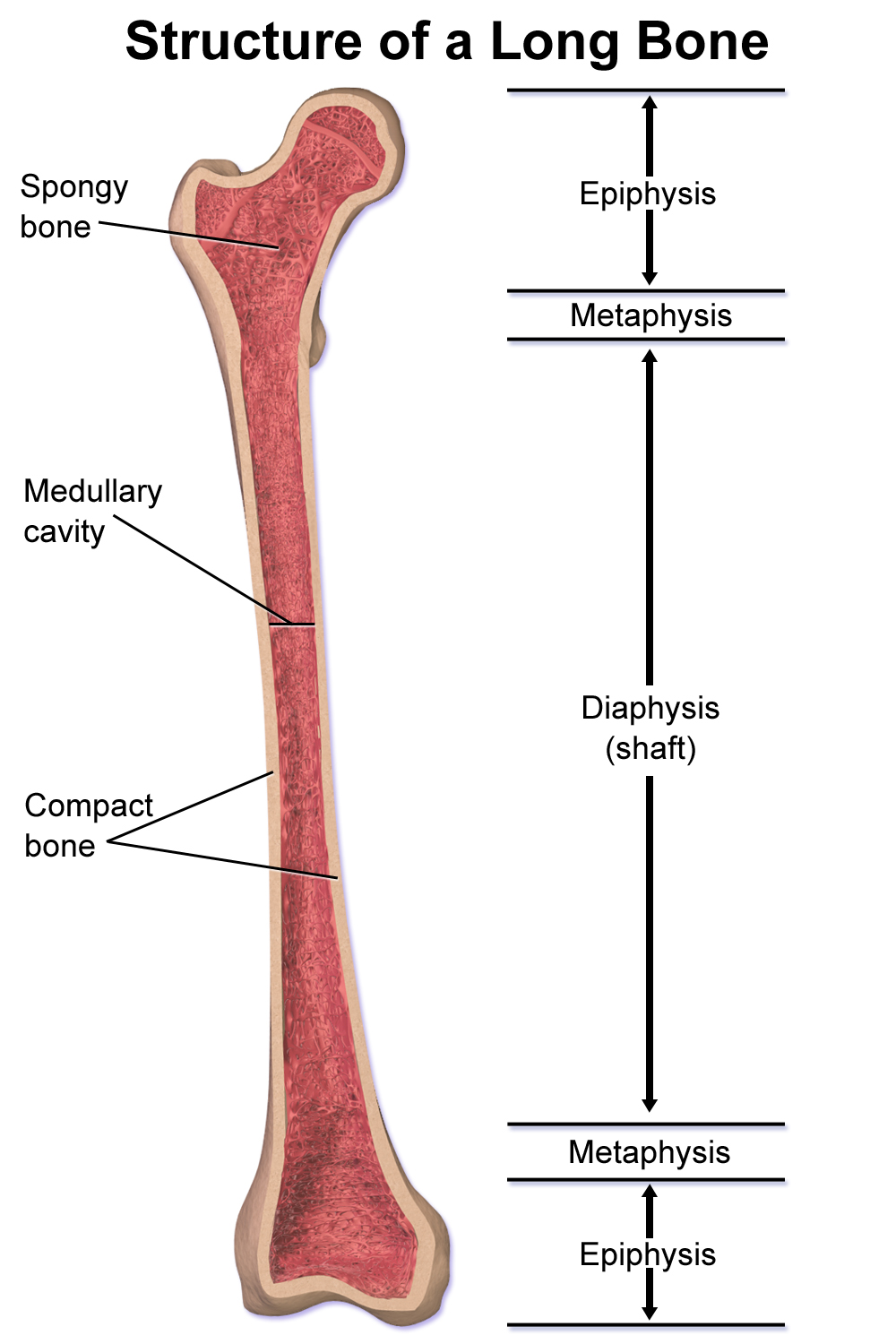
- Structure of a long bone, with epiphysis labeled at top and bottom.

Details
- Pronunciation: /ɛˈpɪfɪsɪs/
- Part of: Long bones

Identifiers
- MeSH: D004838
- TA98: A02.0.00.018
- TA2: 393
- FMA: 24012

An epiphysis (from Ancient Greek ἐπί (epí) 'on top of' and φύσις (phúsis) 'growth'; pl.: epiphyses) is one of the rounded ends or tips of a long bone that ossified from one or more secondary centers of ossification, often forming a distinct head and sometimes also an angulated neck. The epiphysis is spongy and filled with red bone marrow, which produces erythrocytes (red blood cells).

Between the epiphysis and diaphysis (the long shaft or midsection of the long bone) lies the metaphysis, including the epiphyseal plate (growth plate), where the growth of bone length mainly occurs. During formation of the secondary ossification center, vascular canals (epiphysial canals) stemming from the perichondrium invade the epiphysis, supplying nutrients and osteoblasts to the developing secondary centers of ossification. At the joint, the epiphysis is covered with articular cartilage; below that covering is a zone similar to the epiphyseal plate, known as subchondral bone.

The epiphysis is mostly found in mammals but it is also present in some lizards. However, the secondary center of ossification may have evolved multiple times, having been found in the Jurassic sphenodont Sapheosaurus as well as in the therapsid Niassodon mfumukasi.

== Structure ==
There are four types of epiphyses:

1. Pressure epiphysis: The region of the long bone that forms the joint is a pressure epiphysis (e.g. the head of the femur, part of the hip joint complex). Pressure epiphyses assist in transmitting the weight of the human body and are the regions of the bone that are under pressure during movement or locomotion. Another example of a pressure epiphysis is the head of the humerus which is part of the shoulder complex. Condyles of femur and tibia also come under the pressure epiphysis.
2. Traction epiphysis: The regions of the long bone which are non-articular, i.e. not involved in joint formation. Unlike pressure epiphyses, these regions do not assist in weight transmission. However, their proximity to the pressure epiphysis region means that the supporting ligaments and tendons attach to these areas of the bone. Traction epiphyses ossify later than pressure epiphyses. Examples of traction epiphyses are tubercles of the humerus (greater tubercle and lesser tubercle), and trochanters of the femur (greater and lesser).
3. Atavistic epiphysis: A bone that is independent phylogenetically but is fused with another bone in humans. These types of fused bones are called atavistic, e.g., the coracoid process of the scapula, which has been fused in humans, but is separate in four-legged animals. os trigonum (posterior tubercle of talus) is another example for atavistic epiphysis.
4. Aberrant epiphysis: These epiphyses are deviations from the norm and are not always present. For example, the epiphysis at the head of the first metacarpal bone and at the base of other metacarpal bones

=== Bones with an epiphysis ===
Many bones in the body contain an epiphysis, a region critical for growth and articulation. The humerus, for example, is situated between the shoulder and elbow and contributes significantly to upper limb movement. Below the elbow are the radius and ulna, two bones that run parallel to each other. In anatomical position, the radius is positioned laterally, while the ulna lies medially. Both bones are essential in forelimb structure and motion.

Distal to the forearm bones are the metacarpal bones, which reside in the forelimb. These bones are located just beyond the wrist and serve as a link to the phalanges, or finger bones, at the end of the limbs.

In the lower body, the femur is a prominent bone positioned between the hip and knee. As the longest bone in the human body, it plays a pivotal role in forming the upper part of the knee joint. In the lower leg, the tibia and fibula are two parallel bones that complete the lower half of the knee joint. The tibia, located medially, bears most of the body's weight, while the fibula, positioned laterally, is smaller and supports leg structure. Further down the leg are the metatarsal bones, found near the distal end of the hindlimb. These bones are positioned proximal to the toe bones, or phalanges, providing support and structure in the foot.

=== Pseudo-epiphysis ===
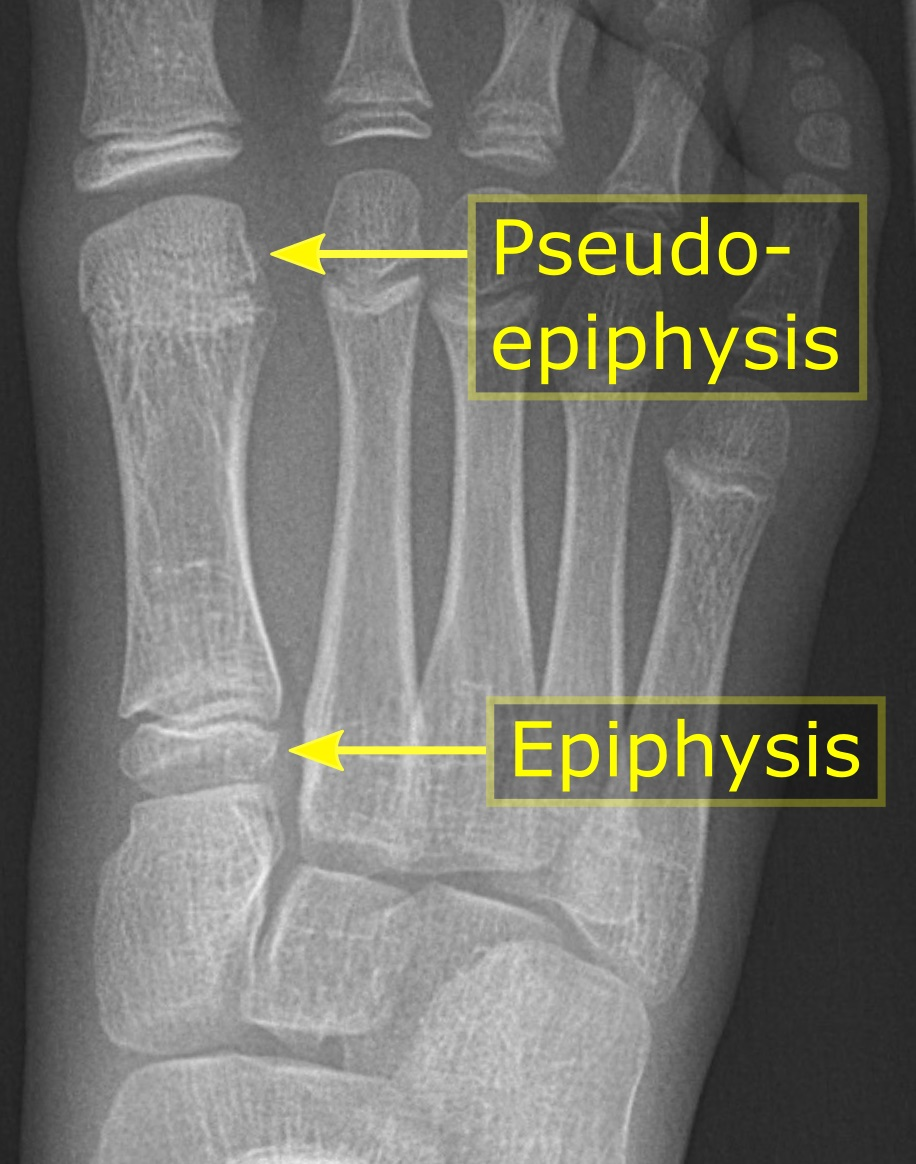
It is common in children to have a pseudo-epiphysis of the first metatarsal.

A pseudo-epiphysis is an epiphysis-looking end of a bone where an epiphysis is not normally located. A pseudo-epiphysis is delineated by a transverse notch, looking similar to a growth plate. However, these transverse notches lack the typical cell columns found in normal growth plates, and do not contribute significantly to longitudinal bone growth. Pseudo-epiphyses are found at the distal end of the first metacarpal bone in 80% of the normal population, and at the proximal end of the second metacarpal in 60%.

== Clinical significance ==
Pathologies of the epiphysis include avascular necrosis and osteochondritis dissecans (OCD). OCD involves the subchondral bone.

Epiphyseal lesions include chondroblastoma and giant-cell tumor.

== Additional images ==
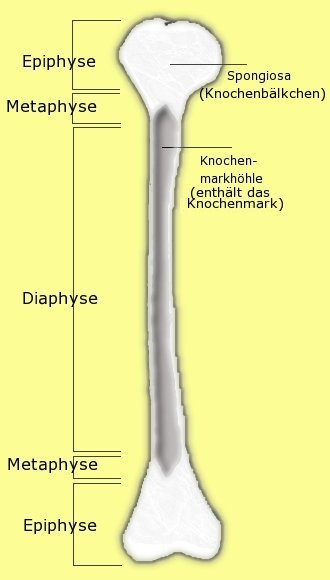
Long bone

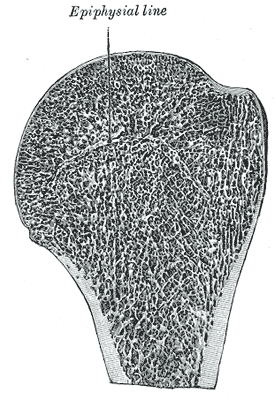
Longitudinal section of head of left humerus.

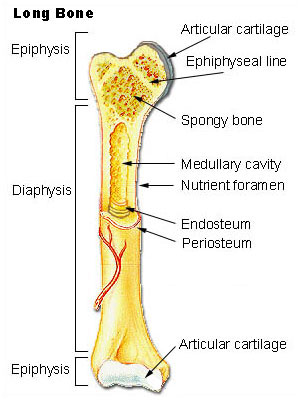
