= Metaphysis =

Neck portion of a long bone between the epiphysis and the diaphysis

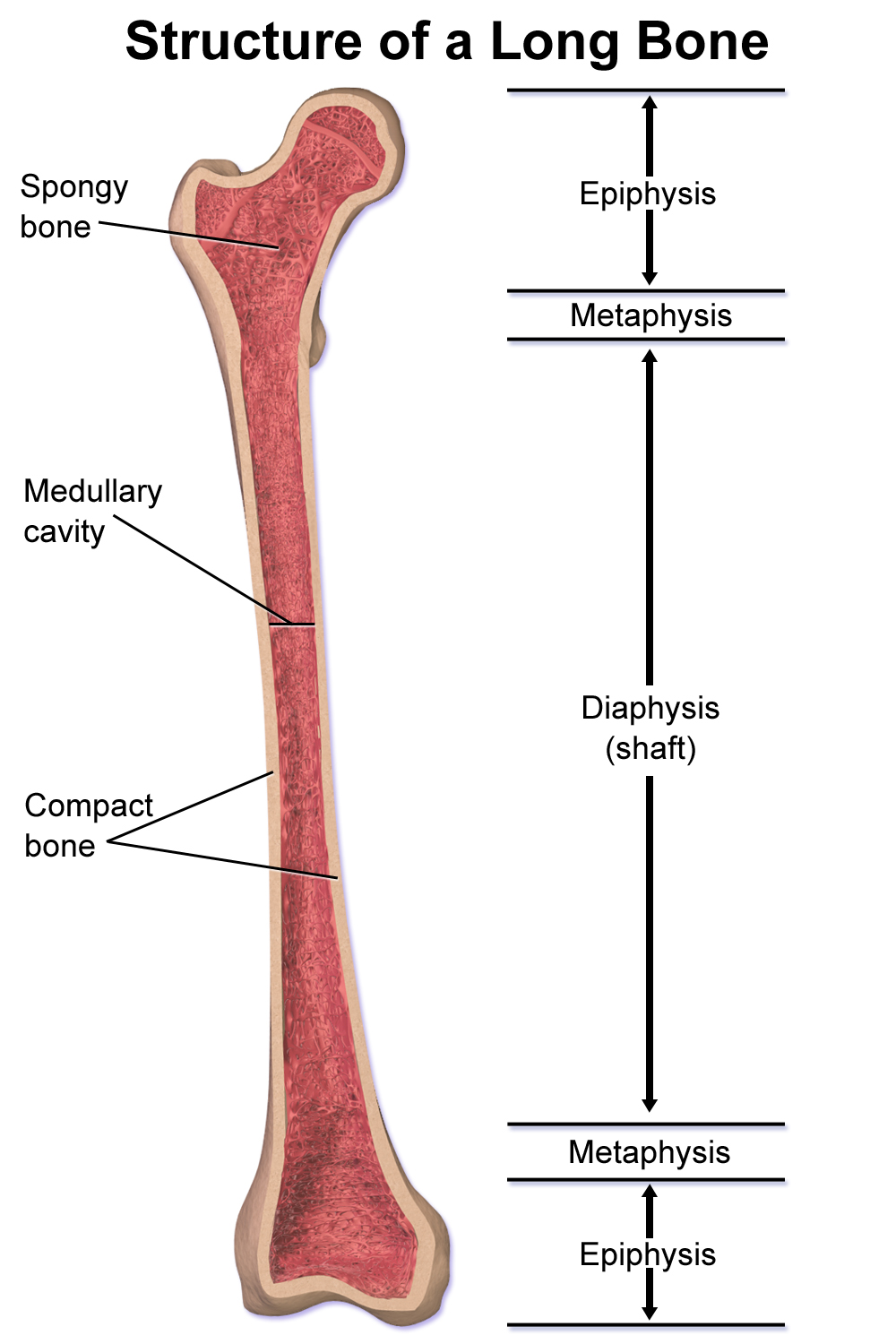
- Structure of a long bone, showing the metaphysis

Details
- Pronunciation: /mətˈæfɪsɪs/
- Part of: Long bones

Identifiers
- Latin: metaphysis
- TA98: A02.0.00.022
- TA2: 392
- FMA: 24014

The metaphysis (pl.: metaphyses) is the neck portion of a long bone between the epiphysis and the diaphysis. It contains the growth plate, the part of the bone that grows during childhood, and as it grows it ossifies near the diaphysis and the epiphyses. The metaphysis contains a diverse population of cells including mesenchymal stem cells, which give rise to bone and fat cells, as well as hematopoietic stem cells which give rise to a variety of blood cells as well as bone-destroying cells called osteoclasts. Thus the metaphysis contains a highly metabolic set of tissues including trabecular (spongy) bone, blood vessels, as well as marrow adipose tissue (MAT).

The metaphysis may be divided anatomically into three components based on tissue content: a cartilaginous component (epiphyseal plate), a bony component (metaphysis) and a fibrous component surrounding the periphery of the plate. The growth plate synchronizes chondrogenesis with osteogenesis or interstitial cartilage growth with both appositional bone elongation in conjunction with growth in width, so bearing load and responding to local and systemic forces and factors balance one another mechanically.

During childhood, the growth plate contains the connecting cartilage enabling the bone to grow; at adulthood (between the ages of 18 and 25 years), the components of the growth plate stop growing altogether and completely ossify into solid bone. In an adult, the metaphysis functions to transfer loads from weight-bearing joint surfaces to the diaphysis.

== Clinical significance ==
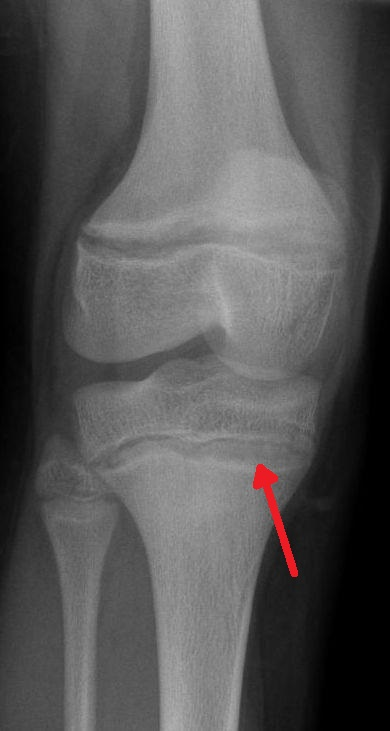
An X ray demonstrating the characteristic finding of lead poisoning in humans—dense metaphyseal lines.

Because of their rich blood supply and vascular stasis, metaphyses of long bones are prone to hematogenous spread of osteomyelitis in children.

Metaphyseal tumors or lesions include osteosarcoma, chondrosarcoma, fibrosarcoma, osteoblastoma, enchondroma, fibrous dysplasia, simple bone cyst, aneurysmal bone cyst, non-ossifying fibroma, and osteoid osteoma.

One of the clinical signs of rickets that doctors look for is cupping and fraying at the metaphyses when seen on X-ray.

== See also ==
- Diaphysis
- Epiphysis
