= Diaphysis =

Shaft of a long bone, containing bone marrow

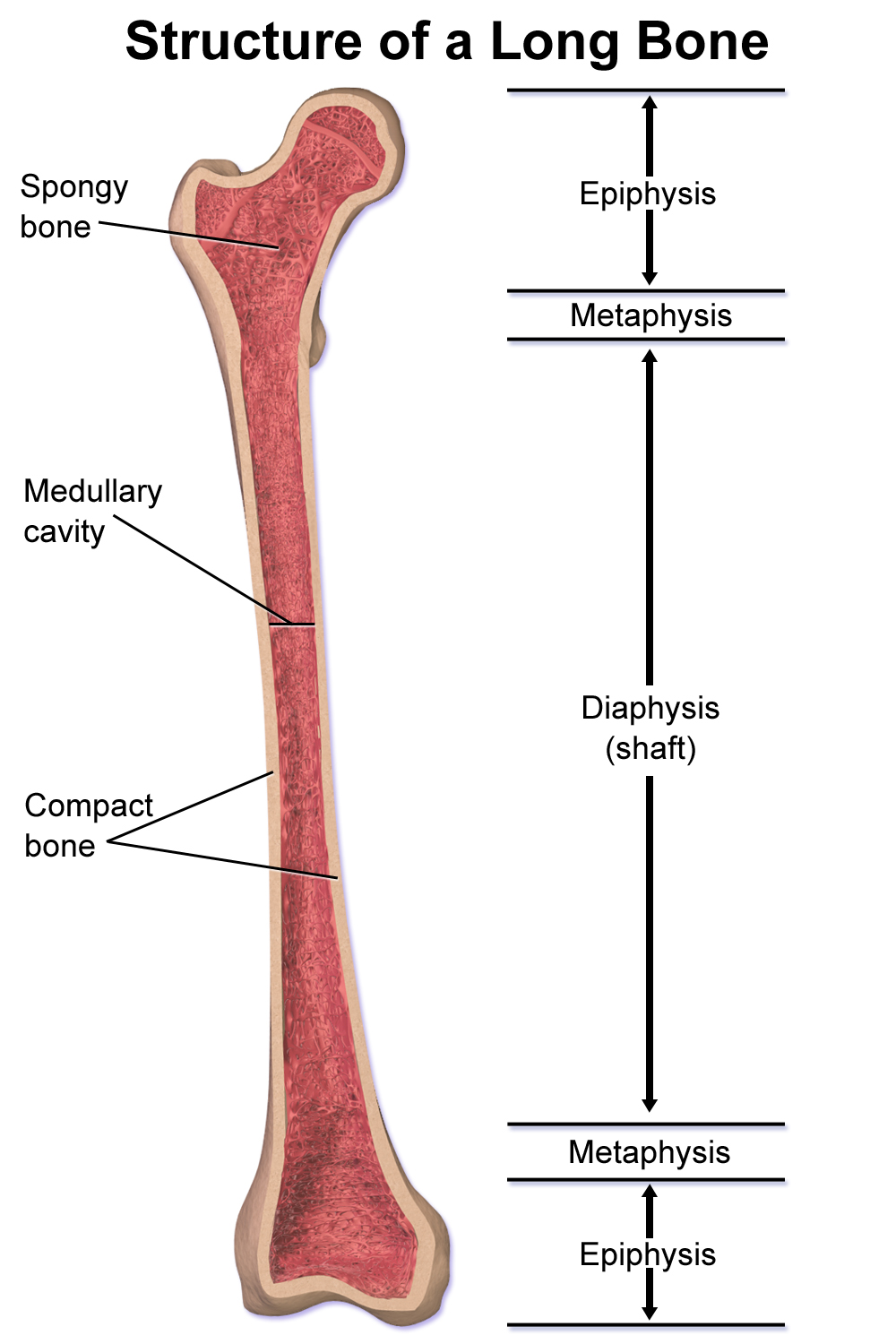
- A long bone, with the diaphysis labeled at right.

Details
- Pronunciation: /daɪˈæfɪsɪs/ dy-AF-iss-iss
- Part of: Long bones

Identifiers
- MeSH: D018483
- TA98: A02.0.00.017
- TA2: 391
- FMA: 24013

The diaphysis (pl.: diaphyses) is the main or midsection (shaft) of a long bone. It is made up of cortical bone and usually contains bone marrow and adipose tissue (fat).

It is a middle tubular part composed of compact bone which surrounds a central marrow cavity which contains red or yellow marrow. In diaphysis, primary ossification occurs.

Ewing sarcoma tends to occur at the diaphysis.

== Additional images ==
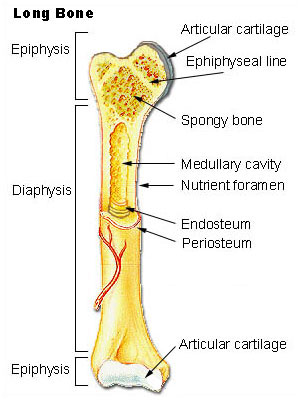

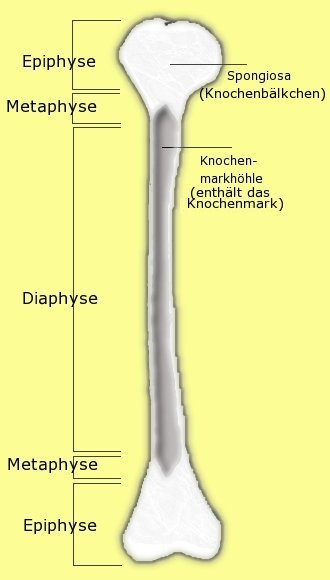
Long bone

== See also ==
- Epiphysis
- Metaphysis
