= Brodie abscess =

Bone infection

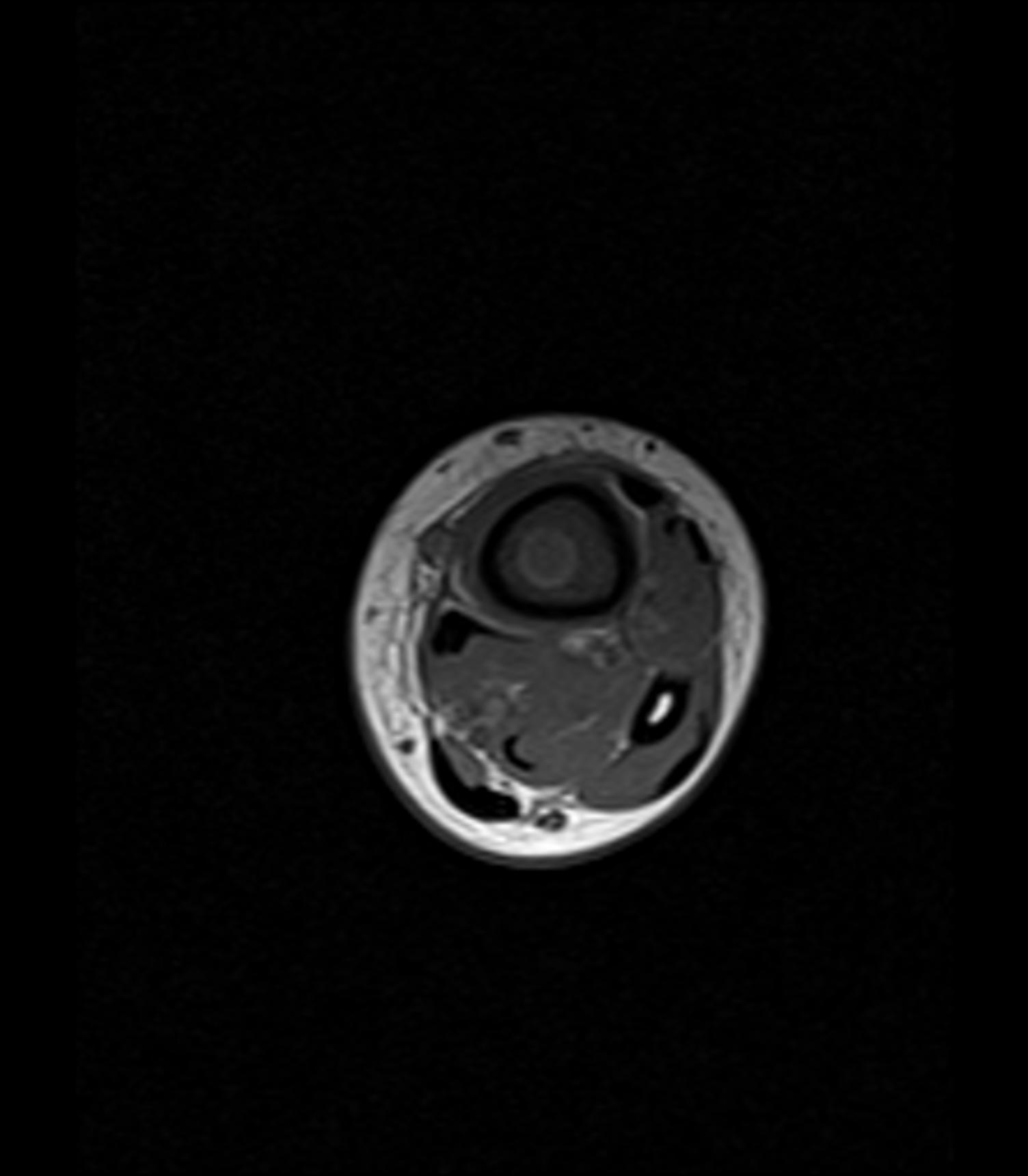
- Axial T1-weighted MRI image through the distal tibia showing Brodie abscess.
- Specialty: Orthopedic surgery

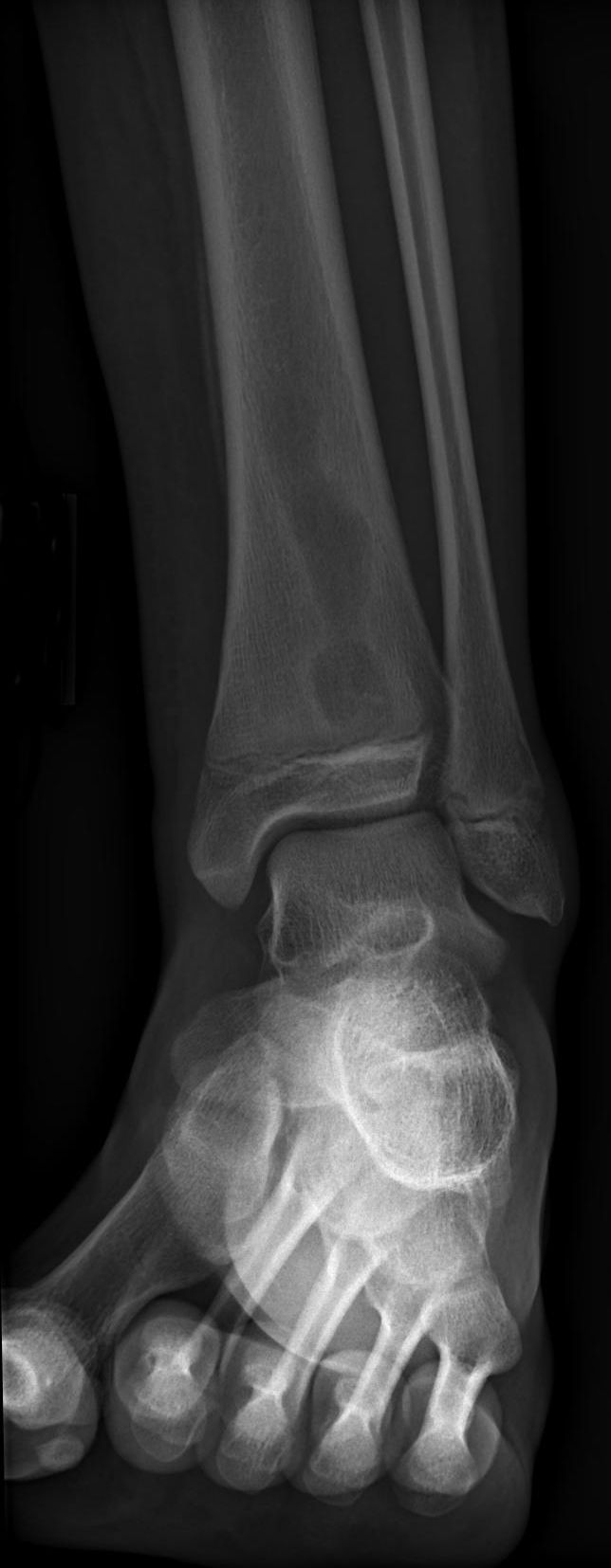
AP X-ray demonstrating a Brodie's abscess as a well circumscribed lytic lesion with a sclerotic rim, extending from the metaphysis.

A Brodie abscess is a subacute osteomyelitis, appearing as an accumulation of pus in bone, frequently with an insidious onset. Brodie's abscess is characterized by pain and swelling without fever, often resulting from diabetic wounds, fracture-related bone infection, or haematogenous osteomyelitis.

The condition is often diagnosed through imaging, which reveals distinctive "target signs" such as central necrosis, surrounding granulation tissue, fibrosis, and an outermost layer of oedema. A biopsy can rule out other possible diagnoses, such as bone tumors.

Surgery is the main treatment, often combined with antibiotics. The prognosis is generally favorable, with minimal risk of lasting disability or recurrence.

Brodie abscess is responsible for 2.5%-42% of primary bone infections. It is named after Sir Benjamin Collins Brodie, 1st Baronet, who initially described the condition in the 1830s.

== Signs and symptoms ==
Brodie's abscess causes a collection of pus in the bone causing pain and swelling. There is usually no signs or symptoms of a systematic disease. Brodie's abscess usually occurs in the tibia or femur.

== Causes ==
When it comes to bone infections, there exist multiple etiologies: exposed bone in diabetic wounds, fracture-related bone infection following (open) trauma, or haematogenous osteomyelitis. Causative organisms include Staphylococcus aureus, Pseudomonas, Klebsiella, and coagulase-negative Staphylococcus.

== Diagnosis ==
Since patients frequently appear with pain and swelling without a fever, diagnosis can be difficult. Blood cultures and inflammatory indicators are frequently non-revealing, hence a high level of suspicion is required to diagnose this type of osteomyelitis. When diagnosing Brodie's abscess, imaging is crucial. The "target sign" on MRI, which includes central necrosis, surrounding granulation tissue, fibrosis or sclerosis, and an outermost layer of oedema, is distinctive. A biopsy can be useful in ruling out other possible diagnoses, like a bone tumor.

A variety of benign and malignant bone abnormalities, including as cysts, osteoid osteoma, giant cell tumors, chondroblastomas, and Ewing sarcoma, are included in the differential diagnosis of Brodie abscess.

== Treatment ==
Surgery was the main form of treatment, frequently in conjunction with antibiotics.

== Outlook ==
The prognosis is usually favorable, with very little likelihood of a lasting disability or recurrence.

== Epidemiology ==
Brodie abscess is responsible for 2.5%–42% of primary bone infections.

== History ==
Brodie abscess is named after Sir Benjamin Collins Brodie, 1st Baronet. In the 1830s, he initially described a chronic inflammatory condition affecting the tibia without obvious acute etiology.

== See also ==
- Osteomyelitis
- Osteitis fibrosa cystica
