= Giant-cell tumor of bone =

Bone tumor composed of agglomerated osteoclast-like cells

- Other names: Osteoclastoma
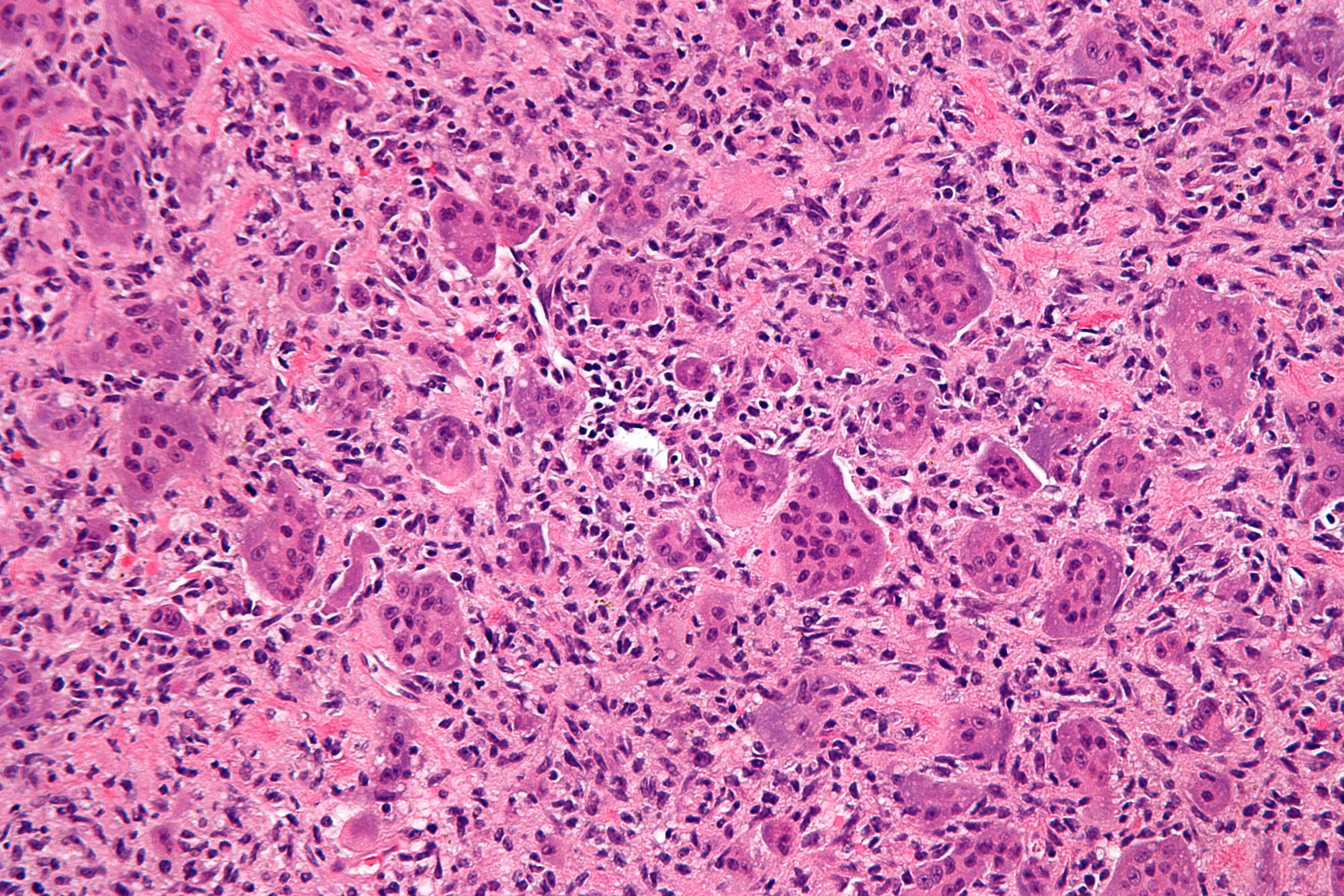
- Micrograph of a giant-cell tumor of bone showing the characteristic giant cells, H&E stain
- Specialty: Oncology, orthopedic surgery

Giant-cell tumor of the bone (GCTOB) is a relatively uncommon bone tumor characterized by the presence of multinucleated giant cells (osteoclast-like cells). Malignancy in giant-cell tumor is uncommon and occurs in about 2% of all cases. However, if malignant degeneration does occur, it is likely to metastasize to the lungs. Giant-cell tumors are normally benign, with unpredictable behavior.

It is a heterogeneous tumor composed of different cell populations. The giant-cell tumour stromal cells (GCTSC) constitute the neoplastic cells, which are from a mesenchymal stem cell origin and are classified based on expression of osteoblast cell markers such as alkaline phosphatase and osteocalcin. In contrast, the mononuclear osteoclast precursor cells giving rise to multinucleated giant cells (MNGC) are secondarily recruited and comprise the non-neoplastic cell population. They are derived from an hematopoietic monocyte/ macrophage lineage determined primarily by expression of CD68, a marker for monocytic precursor cells. In most patients, the tumors are slow to develop, but may recur locally in as many as 50% of cases.

== Signs and symptoms ==
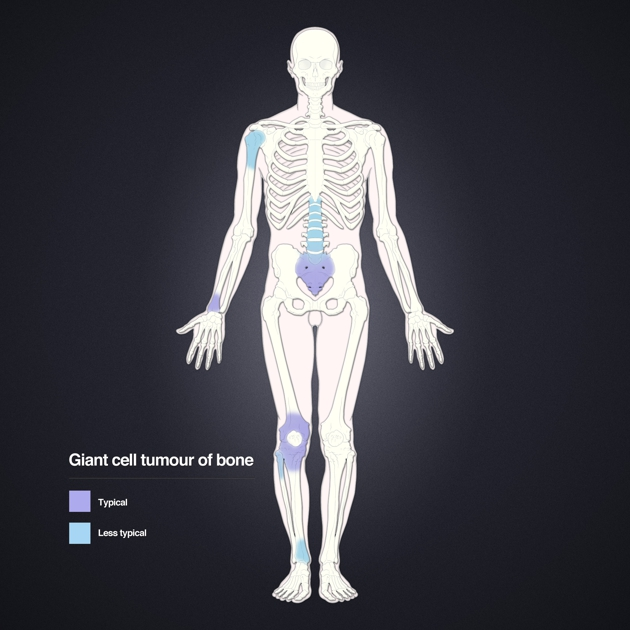
Distribution of giant-cell tumors of bone

Patients usually present with pain and limited range of motion caused by tumor's proximity to the joint space. Swelling may occur, as well, if the tumor has been growing for a long time. Some patients may be asymptomatic until they develop a pathologic fracture at the site of the tumor. They usually originate from the epiphysis of long bones, but in rare cases, they may arise from anterior arc of the ribs.

== Diagnosis ==
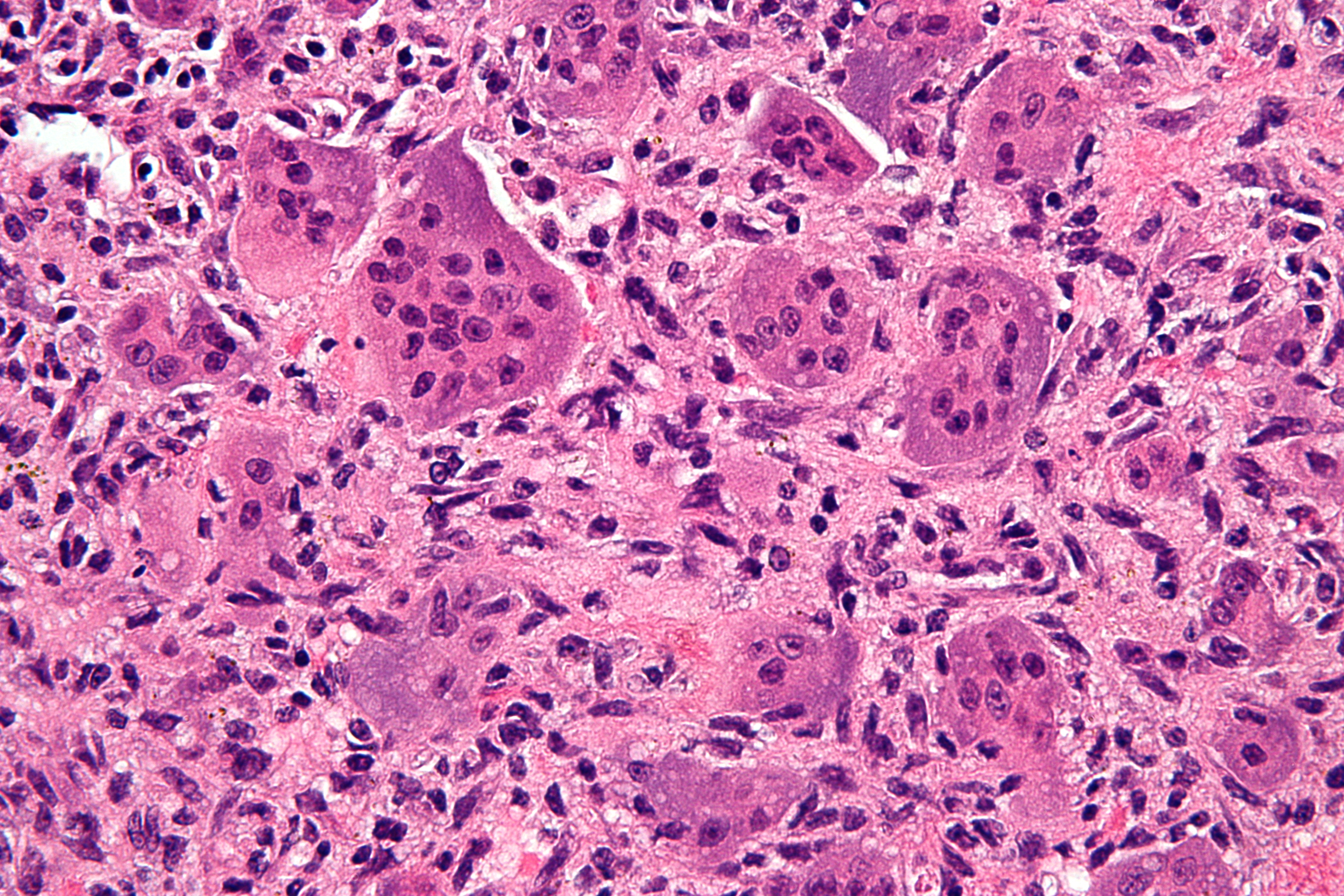
High magnification micrograph of giant cells in a giant-cell tumor of bone, H&E stain

The diagnosis of giant-cell tumor is based on biopsy findings. The key histomorphologic feature is, as the name of the entity suggests, (multinucleated) giant cells with up to a hundred nuclei that have prominent nucleoli. Surrounding mononuclear and small multinucleated cells have nuclei similar to those in the giant cells; this distinguishes the lesion from other osteogenic lesions which commonly have (benign) osteoclast-type giant cells.

=== Imaging ===
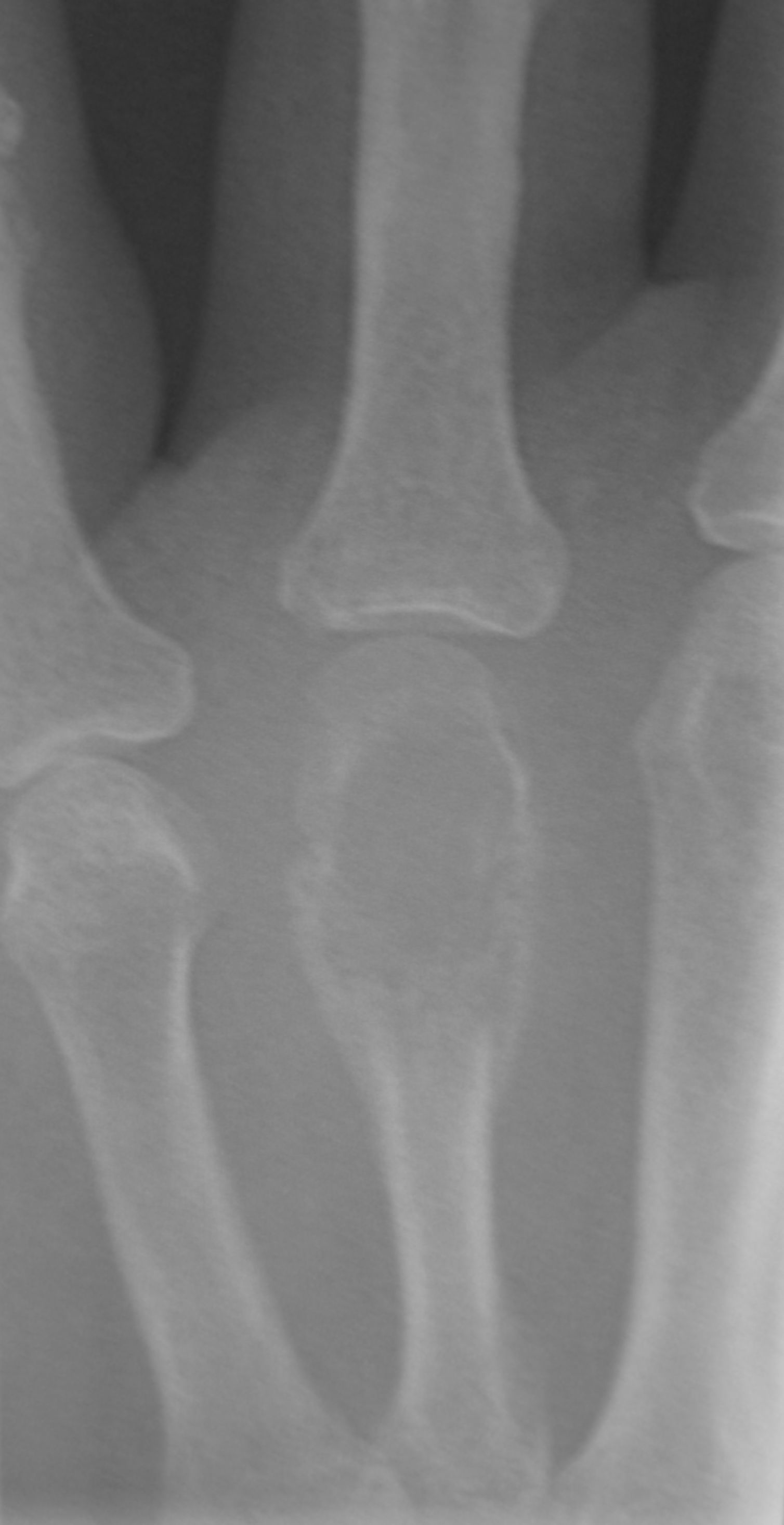
X-ray of a giant-cell bone tumor in the head of the fourth metacarpal of the left hand

On radiographs, giant-cell tumors (GCTs) are lytic/lucent lesions that have an epiphyseal location and grow to the articular surface of the involved bone. Radiologically the tumors may show characteristic 'soap bubble' appearance. They are distinguishable from other bony tumors in that GCTs usually have a nonsclerotic and sharply defined border. About 2% of giant-cell tumors metastasize, usually to a lung, which may be benign metastasis.

Radiographs are still the main method of diagnosing giant cell tumour. But MRI and CT scans are useful for staging and surgical planning. CT is superior to plain radiograph in delineating the tumour outline, its extension into structures outside the bone, determining the involvement of bony cortex and tumour recurrence. CT scans show features such as thin and expanded bony cortex, with or without bony matrix calcifications, and fluid levels due to aneurysmal bone cyst or bleeding within tumour. However, axial views of the subarticular bone (bony area adjacent to the articular cartilage) is not accurate due to voxel signal averaging. MRI is superior to CT on delineating the tumour because of its better contrast resolution and imaging in multiple planes. MRI is also useful in determining the extension outside the bone and evaluating the involvement of the articular surface, skip lesions within bony matrix, and medullary cavity. However, bony cortex destruction is better demonstrated on CT scan.

On MRI, the mass generates intermediate to reduced signal intensity on T1-weighted images, and increased signal intensity on fluid sensitive MRI images such as short tau inversion recovery (STIR). The mass enhances after intravenous gadolinium administration.

=== Differential diagnosis ===
A number of tumors have giant cells, but are not true benign giant-cell tumors. These include aneurysmal bone cyst, chondroblastoma, simple bone cyst, osteoid osteoma, osteoblastoma, osteosarcoma, giant-cell reparative granuloma, Giant-cell tumor of the tendon sheath and brown tumor of hyperparathyroidism.

== Treatment ==
General treatment regimens have not changed much in the past 30 years, in part due to the lack of randomized clinical trials. Surgery is the treatment of choice if the tumor is determined to be resectable. Curettage is a commonly used technique. The situation is complicated in a patient with a pathological fracture. It may be best to immobilize the affected limb and wait for the fracture to heal before performing surgery.

Patients with tumors that are not amenable to surgery are treated with radiation therapy. However caution is employed since a majority of recurrent tumors with transformations to the malignant sarcoma phenotype have been in patients receiving radiotherapy for their primary benign lesion. Pharmacotherapy for GCTOB, includes bisphosphonates such as Zoledronate, which are thought to induce apoptosis in the MNGC fraction, preventing tumor-induced osteolysis. Indeed, in vitro studies have shown zoledronate to be effective in killing osteoclast-like cells. More recently, humanized monoclonal antibodies such as Denosumab targeting the RANK ligand have been employed in treatment of GCTOB in a phase II study. This is based on the notion that increased expression of RANK-ligands by stromal cells plays a role in tumor pathogenesis.

== Epidemiology ==
Giant-cell tumor of the bone accounts for 4-5% of primary bone tumors and about 20% of benign bone tumors. However, significantly higher incidence rates are observed in Asia, where it constitutes about 20% of all primary bone tumors in China. It is slightly more common in females, has a predilection for the epiphyseal/metaphyseal region of long bones, and generally occurs in the third to fourth decade. Although classified as a benign tumor, GCTOB has been observed to metastasize to the lungs in up to 5% of cases, and in rare instances (1-3%) can transform to the malignant sarcoma phenotype with equal disease outcome.

== See also ==
- Large cell
- Aneurysmal bone cyst
