= Aneurysmal bone cyst =

Benign bone tumor consisting of blood

- Other names: Not recommended: Giant cell reparative granuloma of small bone, giant cell lesion of small bones
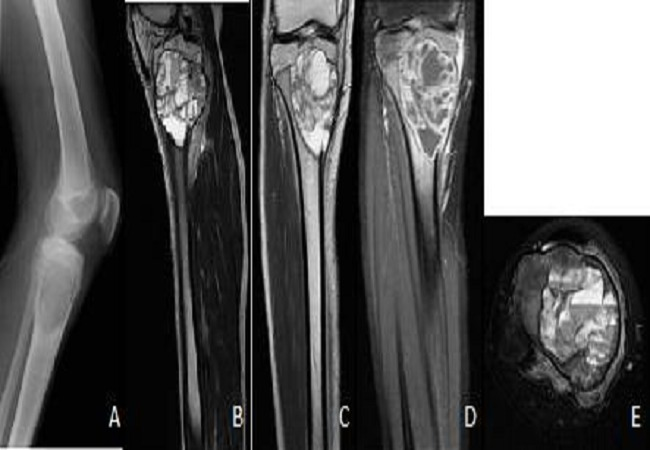
- A. X-ray: osteolytic lesion in tibia near knee. B/C/D/E. MRI with E showing fluid levels.
- Specialty: Orthopedics
- Symptoms: Pain, swelling, pressure related neurological symptoms
- Causes: Unknown
- Diagnostic method: Medical imaging: CT scan, X-ray, MRI, bone scan.
- Differential diagnosis: Telangiectatic osteosarcoma
- Treatment: Surgery
- Prognosis: 20-70% recur after curettage.
- Frequency: Rare, ~0.15 cases per one million per year. 80% age <20 years. M=F

Aneurysmal bone cyst (ABC) is a non-cancerous bone tumor composed of multiple varying sizes of spaces in a bone which are filled with blood. The term is a misnomer, as the lesion is neither an aneurysm nor a cyst. It generally presents with pain and swelling in the affected bone. Pressure on neighbouring tissues may cause compression effects such as neurological symptoms.

The cause is unknown. Diagnosis involves medical imaging. CT scan and X-ray show lytic expansion lesions with clear borders. MRI reveals fluid levels.

Treatment is usually by curettage, bone grafting or surgically removing the part of bone. 20–30% may recur, usually in the first couple of years after treatment, particularly in children.

It is rare. The incidence is around 0.15 cases per one million per year. Aneurysmal bone cyst was first described by Jaffe and Lichtenstein in 1942.

== Signs and symptoms ==
The afflicted may have relatively small amounts of pain that will quickly increase in severity over a time period of 6–12 weeks. The skin temperature around the bone may increase, a bony swelling may be evident, and movement may be restricted in adjacent joints.

Spinal lesions may cause quadriplegia and patients with skull lesions may have headaches.

=== Sites ===
Commonly affected sites are metaphyses of vertebra, flat bones, femur and tibia. Approximate percentages by sites are as shown:

- Skull and mandible (4%)
- Spine (16%)
- Clavicle and ribs (5%)
- Upper extremity (21%)
- Pelvis and sacrum (12%)
- Femur (13%)
- Lower leg (24%)
- Foot (3%)

== Causes ==
Aneurysmal bone cyst has been widely regarded a reactive process of uncertain cause since its initial description by Jaffe and Lichtenstein in 1942. Many hypotheses have been proposed to explain the cause and pathogenesis of aneurysmal bone cyst, and until very recently the most commonly accepted idea was that aneurysmal bone cyst was the consequence of an increased venous pressure and resultant dilation and rupture of the local vascular network. However, studies by Panoutsakopoulus et al. and Oliveira et al. uncovered the clonal neoplastic nature of aneurysmal bone cyst. Primary cause has been regarded arteriovenous fistula within bone.

The lesion may arise de novo or may arise secondarily within a pre-existing bone tumor, because the abnormal bone causes changes in hemodynamics. An aneurysmal bone cyst can arise from a pre-existing chondroblastoma, a chondromyxoid fibroma, an osteoblastoma, a giant cell tumor, or fibrous dysplasia. A giant cell tumor is the most common cause, occurring in 19–39% of cases. Less frequently, it results from some malignant tumors, such as osteosarcoma, chondrosarcoma, and hemangioendothelioma.

== Pathology ==
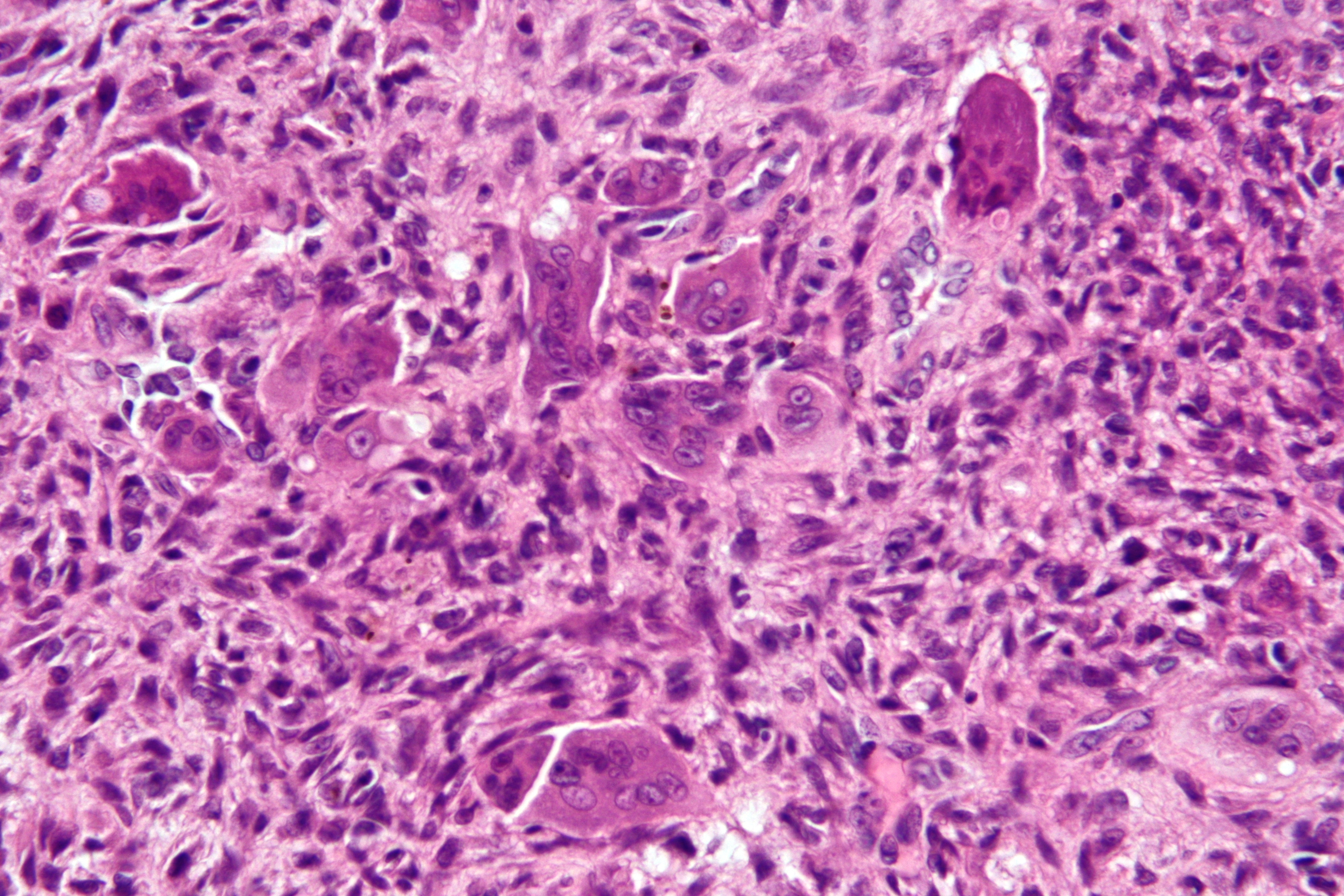
Micrograph of an aneurysmal bone cyst. H&E stain.

Histologically, they are classified in two variants.

- The classic (or standard) form (95%) has blood filled clefts among bony trabeculae. Osteoid tissue is found in stromal matrix.
- The solid form (5%) shows fibroblastic proliferation, osteoid production and degenerated calcifying fibromyxoid elements.

According to Buraczewski and Dabska, the development of the aneurysmal bone cyst follows three stages.

| Stage | Description |
|---|---|
| Initial phase (I) | Osteolysis without peculiar findings |
| Growth phase (II) | Rapid increase in size of osseous erosion; Enlargement of involved bone; Formation of shell around central part of lesion |
| Stabilization phase (III) | Fully developed radiological pattern |

They can also be associated with a TRE17/USP6 translocation.

Aneurysmal bone cysts may be intraosseous, staying inside of the bone marrow. Or they may be extraosseous, developing on the surface of the bone, and extending into the marrow. A radiograph will reveal a soap bubble appearance.

== Diagnosis ==
X-ray and CT scan show lytic expansion lesions with clear borders. Expansion of cortex gives the lesion a balloon-like appearance. Larger lesions may appear septated. MRI reveals fluid levels. Bone scan shows outer radiotracer uptake, with a central dark area.

=== Differential diagnosis ===
Following conditions are excluded before diagnosis can be confirmed:

- Unicameral bone cyst
- Giant cell tumor
- Telangiectatic osteosarcoma
- Secondary aneurysmal bone cyst

== Treatment ==
Curettage is performed on some people, and is sufficient for inactive lesions. The recurrence rate with curettage is significant in active lesions, and marginal resection has been advised. Liquid nitrogen, phenol, methyl methacrylate are considered for use to kill cells at margins of resected cyst.

== Prognosis ==
20–70% recur after curettage.

== Epidemiology ==
It is rare. The incidence is around 0.15 cases per one million per year. 80% occur in people age less than 20 years. It is second most common tumor of spine and most common benign tumor of pelvis in pediatric population. Males and females are equally affected.

== Additional images ==
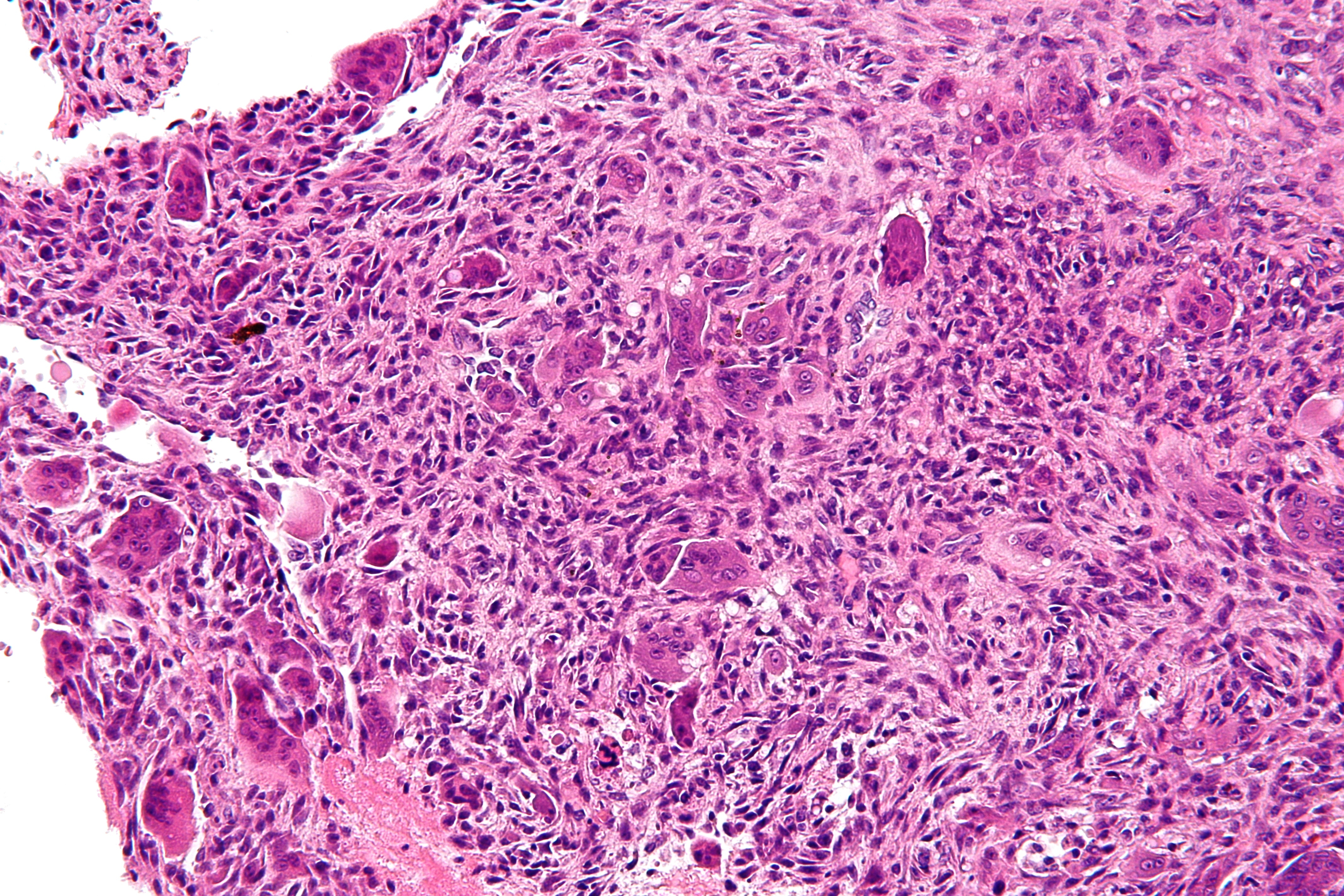
High magnification micrograph of an aneurysmal bone cyst

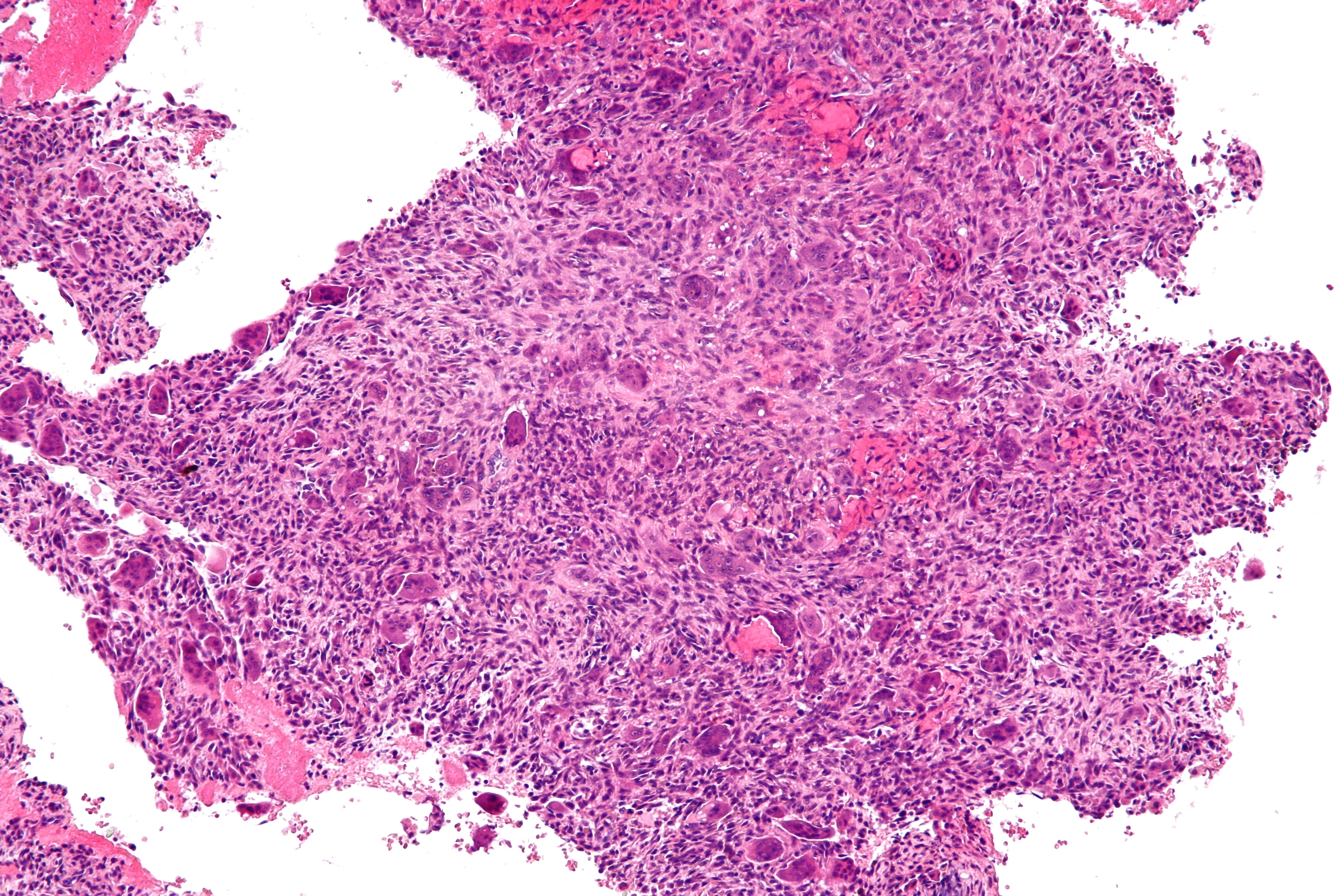
Intermediate magnification micrograph of an aneurysmal bone cyst

== See also ==
- Simple bone cyst (SBC)
- Giant cell tumor of bone
- Traumatic bone cyst
