= Cartilage tumor =

Class of bone tumors developing within cartilage

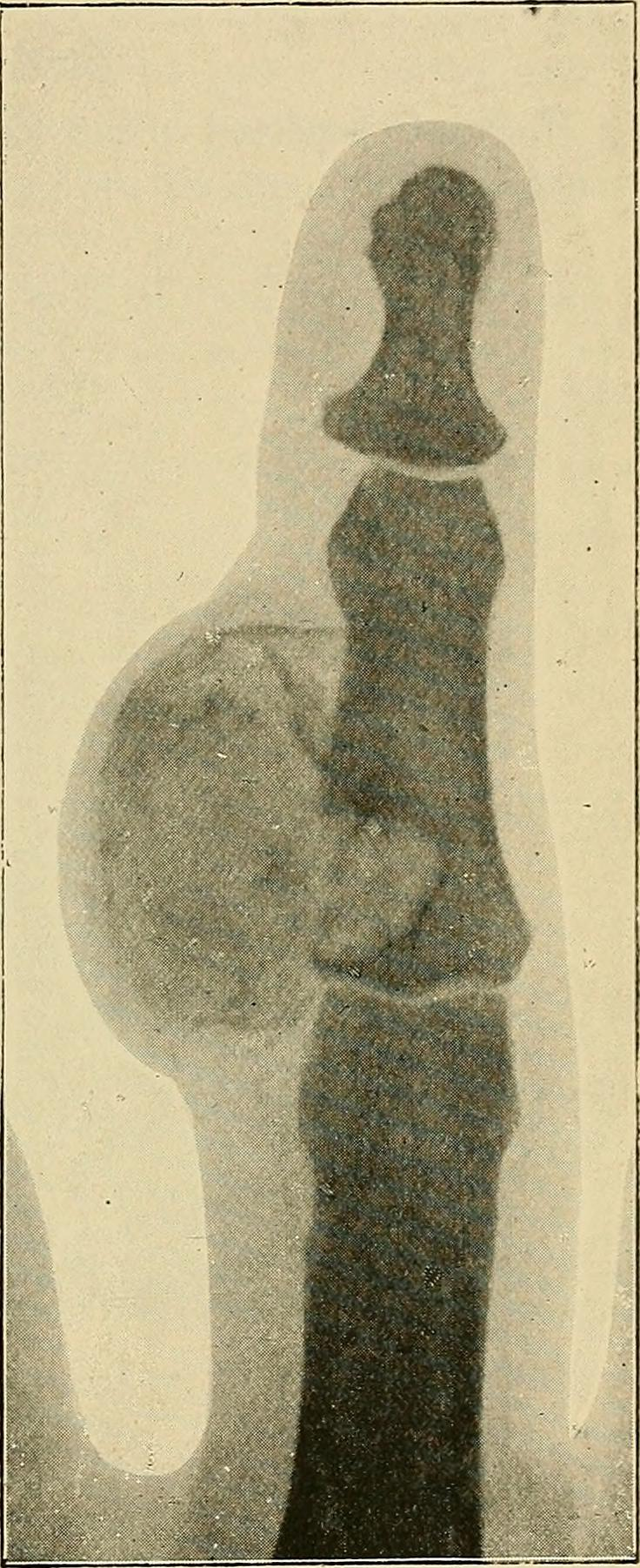
X-ray of "Ossifying Enchondroma" on a finger, published 1907

Cartilage tumors, also known as chondrogenic tumors, are a type of bone tumor that develop in cartilage, and are divided into non-cancerous, cancerous and intermediate locally aggressive types.

Type of cartilage tumor	Name
Non-cancerous	Subungal exostosis
Non-cancerous	Bizarre parosteal osteochondromatous proliferation
Non-cancerous	Periosteal chondroma
Non-cancerous	Enchondroma
Non-cancerous	Osteochondroma
Non-cancerous	Chondroblastoma
Non-cancerous	Chondromyxoid fibroma
Non-cancerous	Osteochondromyxoma
Locally aggressive	Chondromatosis
Locally aggressive	Atypical cartilaginous tumor
Cancerous (chondrosarcoma)	Conventional chondrosarcoma grade I-III
Cancerous (chondrosarcoma)	Clear cell chondrosarcoma
Cancerous (chondrosarcoma)	Mesenchymal chondrosarcoma
Cancerous (chondrosarcoma)	Dedifferentiated chondrosarcoma

== See also ==
- WHO blue books
