= Chondroblastoma =

Benign cartilage tumor on the ends of long bones

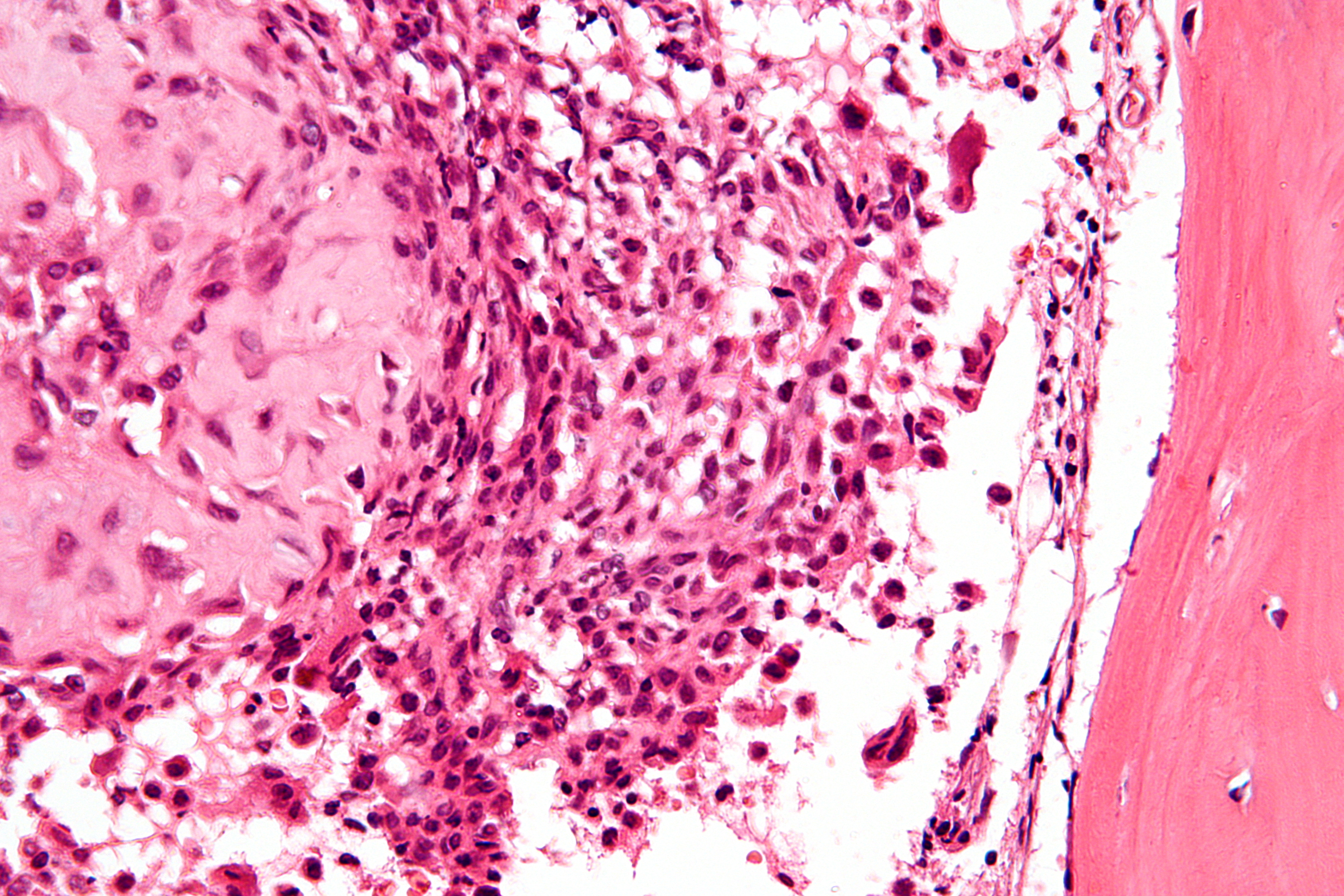
- Micrograph of a chondroblastoma. H&E stain.
- Specialty: Oncology

Chondroblastoma is a rare, benign, locally aggressive bone tumor that typically affects the epiphyses or apophyses of long bones. It is thought to arise from an outgrowth of immature cartilage cells (chondroblasts) from secondary ossification centers, originating from the epiphyseal plate or some remnant of it.

Chondroblastoma is very uncommon, accounting for less than 1% of all bone tumors. (The chances of having this condition are roughly one in a million.) It affects mostly children and young adults, with most patients being less than 20 years of age. Chondroblastoma shows a predilection towards the male sex, with a ratio of male to female patients of 2:1. The most commonly affected site is the femur, followed by the humerus and tibia. Less commonly affected sites include the talus and calcaneus of the foot and flat bones.

== Signs and symptoms ==
The most common symptom is mild to severe pain that is gradually progressive in the affected region and may be initially attributed to a minor injury or sports-related injury. Pain may be present for several weeks, months, or years. Other symptoms in order of most common to least commonly observed include swelling, a limp (when affected bone is in the lower extremity), joint stiffness, and a soft tissue mass.

Physical findings include localized tenderness and a decreased range of motion in the involved bone and nearby joint, muscle atrophy, a palpable mass, soft tissue swelling, and joint effusion in the affected area. Less commonly, pathological fractures can be found, especially in cases involving the foot. In cases involving the temporal bone, tinnitus, dizziness, and hearing loss have been reported.

In a publication by Turcotte et al., it was found that the average duration of symptoms for patients with chondroblastoma was about 20 months, ranging from 5 weeks to 16 years.

== Risk factors ==
Currently, the genetic or environmental factors that predispose an individual to chondroblastoma are not well understood. Chondroblastoma affects males more often than females at a ratio of 2:1 in most clinical reports. Furthermore, it is most often observed in young patients who are skeletally immature, with most cases diagnosed in the second decade of life. Approximately 92% of patients presenting with chondroblastoma are younger than 30 years. There is no indication of a racial predilection for chondroblastoma.

== Pathogenesis ==
The etiology of chondroblastoma is uncertain, as no specific characteristic abnormality or chromosomal breakpoint has been identified, despite cytogenetic abnormalities being highly specific for some tumors.

Romeo et al has noted that chondroblastoma arising in long bones mainly affects the epiphyses, while in other locations it is close to ossification centers. Additionally, the rare prevalence of chondroblastoma in intra-membranous ossification suggests a close relationship with growth plate cartilage. In chondroblastoma, growth signaling molecules may be present due to the prepubertal signaling network and cartilage growth. Sex hormones are thought to be linked to this process because of the spatial relationship of chondroblastoma with the growth plate and its typical occurrence before growth plate fusion. Both Indian Hedgehog/parathyroid hormone-related protein (IHh/PtHrP) and fibroblast growth factor (FGF) signaling pathways, important for development of the epiphyseal growth plate, are active in chondroblastoma, leading to greater proliferation among the cells in the proliferating/pre-hypertrophic zone (cellular-rich area) versus the hypertrophic/calcifying zone (matrix-rich area). These findings suggest that chondroblastoma is derived from a mesenchymal cell undergoing chondrogenesis via active growth-plate signaling pathways (see Endochondral ossification).

The highly heterogeneous nature of the tumor makes classification particularly difficult, especially considering the origins of chondroblastoma. There are two opposing views on the nature of chondroblastoma, one favoring an osseous origin and the other favoring a cartilaginous origin. The work of Aigner et al suggests that chondroblastoma should be reclassified as a bone-forming neoplasm versus a cartilaginous neoplasm due to the presence of osteoid matrix, type I collagen, and absence of true cartilage matrix (collagen II). However, Edel et al found that collagen II, a marker for mature chondrocytes, was expressed in chondroblastoma, supporting the chondroid nature of the neoplasm. The results of Romeo and colleagues favor the view of Edel et al of chondroblastoma being cartilaginous in nature, but recognize that any definitive determinations regarding the origin of this neoplasm are not possible because of the plasticity of mesenchymal cells when set into different microenvironments and static approaches used in literature. Romeo et al. have observed chondroblastomas to be composed of mesenchymal cells that have completed normal chondrogenesis, along with the production of osteoid and collagen I, which could result from the transdifferentiation of chondrocytes towards osteoblasts.

== Diagnosis ==
=== Imaging studies ===
A variety of imaging studies can be used to diagnose chondroblastoma, with radiographs being the most common. Laboratory studies are not considered useful. Classical chondroblastoma (appearing on long bones) appears as a well-defined eccentric oval or round lytic lesion that usually involves the adjacent bone cortex without periosteal reaction. A sclerotic margin can be seen in some cases. For long bone chondroblastomas the tumor is typically contained to the epiphysis or apophysis but may extend through the epiphyseal plate. Chondroblastomas are usually located in the medullary portion of bones and can, in some cases, include the metaphysis. However, true metaphyseal chondroblastomas are rare and are typically the result of an extension from a neighboring epiphyseal legion. Most lesions are less than 4 cm. A mottled appearance on the radiograph is not atypical and indicates areas of calcification which is commonly associated with skeletally immature patients. Additionally, one-third of all cases involve aneurysmal bone cysts which are thought to be the result of stress, trauma or hemorrhage. In cases involving older patients or flat bones, typical radiographic presentation is not as common and may mimic aggressive processes.

Other imaging techniques involve computed tomography (CT), magnetic resonance imaging (MRI), and bone scans, which may be helpful in determining the anatomical boundaries, associated edema, or biological activity of the chondroblastoma, respectively. MRI studies may show extensive oedema around the lesion and show variable T2 signal intensity.

=== Histological findings ===
Chondroid differentiation is a common feature of chondroblastoma. A typical histological appearance consists of a combination of oval mononuclear and multi-nucleated osteoclast-type giant cells. However this is not a prerequisite for diagnosis, as cells with epithelioid characteristics have been observed in lesions of the skull and facial bones. A "chicken-wire" appearance is characteristic of chondroblastoma cells and is the result of dystrophic calcification that may surround individual cells. Although, calcification may not be present and is not a prerequisite for diagnosis. Mitotic figures can be observed in chondroblastoma tissue but are not considered atypical in nature, and therefore, should not be viewed as a sign of a more serious pathology. There is no correlation between mitotic activity and location of the lesion. Furthermore, the presence of atypical cells is rare and is not associated with malignant chondroblastoma.

=== Differential diagnosis ===
Chondromyxoid fibromas can share characteristics with chondroblastomas with regards to histologic and radiographic findings. However they more commonly originate from the metaphysis, lack calcification and have a different histologic organization pattern. Other differential diagnoses for chondroblastoma consist of giant cell tumors, bone cysts, eosinophilic granulomas, clear cell chondrosarcomas, and enchondromas (this list is not exhaustive).

== Treatment ==
Chondroblastoma has not been known to spontaneously heal and the standard treatment is surgical curettage of the lesion with bone grafting. To prevent recurrence or complications it is important to excise the entire tumor following strict oncologic criteria. However, in skeletally immature patients intraoperative fluoroscopy may be helpful to avoid destruction of the epiphyseal plate. In patients who are near the end of skeletal growth, complete curettage of the growth plate is an option. In addition to curettage, electric or chemical cauterization (via phenol) can be used as well as cryotherapy and wide or marginal resection. Depending on the size of the subsequent defect, autograft or allograft bone grafts are the preferred filling materials. Other options include substituting polymethylmethacrylate (PMMA) or fat implantation in place of the bone graft. The work of Ramappa et al suggests that packing with PMMA may be a more optimal choice because the heat of polymerization of the cement is thought to kill any remaining lesion.

Both radiotherapy and chemotherapy are not commonly used. Radiotherapy has been implemented in chondroblastoma cases that are at increased risk of being more aggressive and are suspected of malignant transformation. Furthermore, radiofrequency ablation has been used, but is typically most successful for small chondroblastoma lesions (approximately 1.5 cm). Treatment with radiofrequency ablation is highly dependent on size and location due to the increased risk of larger, weight-bearing lesions being at an increased risk for articular collapse and recurrence. Overall, the success and method of treatment is highly dependent upon the location and size of the chondroblastoma.

== Prognosis ==
Although not specific to one mode of management, lesion size, patient sex, or follow-up, the recurrence rate for chondroblastoma is relatively high, and has been shown in select studies to be dependent upon the anatomical location, method of treatment, and biological aggressiveness of the initial lesion. The rate of recurrence is highly variable, ranging between 5% and 40%, as study results are generally inconclusive. However, local recurrence for long bone lesions is around 10%, with chondroblastoma in flat bones having higher recurrence and more complications. Recurrences are more common in cases involving an open epiphyseal plate where they can be attributed to inadequate curettage to avoid damage. Lesions of the proximal femur are particularly problematic because of difficulties accessing the femoral head for complete excision. Chondroblastoma may recur in the soft tissue surrounding the initial lesion, especially in the case of incomplete curettage. Recurrences have been shown to occur between 5 months and 7 years after initial treatment and are generally treated with repeat curettage and excision of affected soft-tissue. No histological differences have been seen between recurrent and non-recurrent chondroblastomas.

Rarely, more aggressive chondroblastomas can metastasize. The most common location for metastases is the lung, with some cases also involving secondary bone sites, soft tissue, skin, or the liver. The prevalence of metastatic chondroblastoma, however, is quite low and is believed to be less than 0.5%. There is no relationship established between metastasis and previous surgery, non-surgical treatment, anatomical location, or patient age. Survival of patients with metastatic lesions is better when the metastases are surgically resectable, as chemotherapy has been shown to have little to no benefit. Prognosis is bleak for patients with malignant chondroblastomas that are resistant to surgery, radiation, and chemotherapy. However, patients with resectable metastases have survived for several years following diagnosis.

While recurrence is the most common complication of chondroblastoma other issues include post-surgery infection, degenerative joint disease, pathological fractures, failure of bone grafts, pre-mature epiphyseal closure, functional impairment, and malignant transformation. Complications are less common in patients presenting with chondroblastoma in accessible areas. Overall, patients with more classical chondroblastoma (appearing in long bones, typical presentation) have better prognoses than patients with atypical chondroblastoma (flat bones, skull, etc.).

== History ==
Chondroblastoma was first described in 1927 as a cartilage-containing giant cell tumor by Kolodny but later characterized by Codman in 1931. Codman believed chondroblastoma to be an "epiphyseal chondromatous giant cell tumor" in the proximal humerus. This view was changed later by a comprehensive review completed by Jaffe and Lichtenstein in 1942 of similar tumors in other locations than the proximal humerus. They re-defined the tumor as a benign chondroblastoma of the bone that is separate from giant cell tumors. However, chondroblastoma of the proximal humerus is still sometimes referred to as Codman's Tumor.
