= Subungual exostosis =

- Other names: Dupuytren subungual exostosis
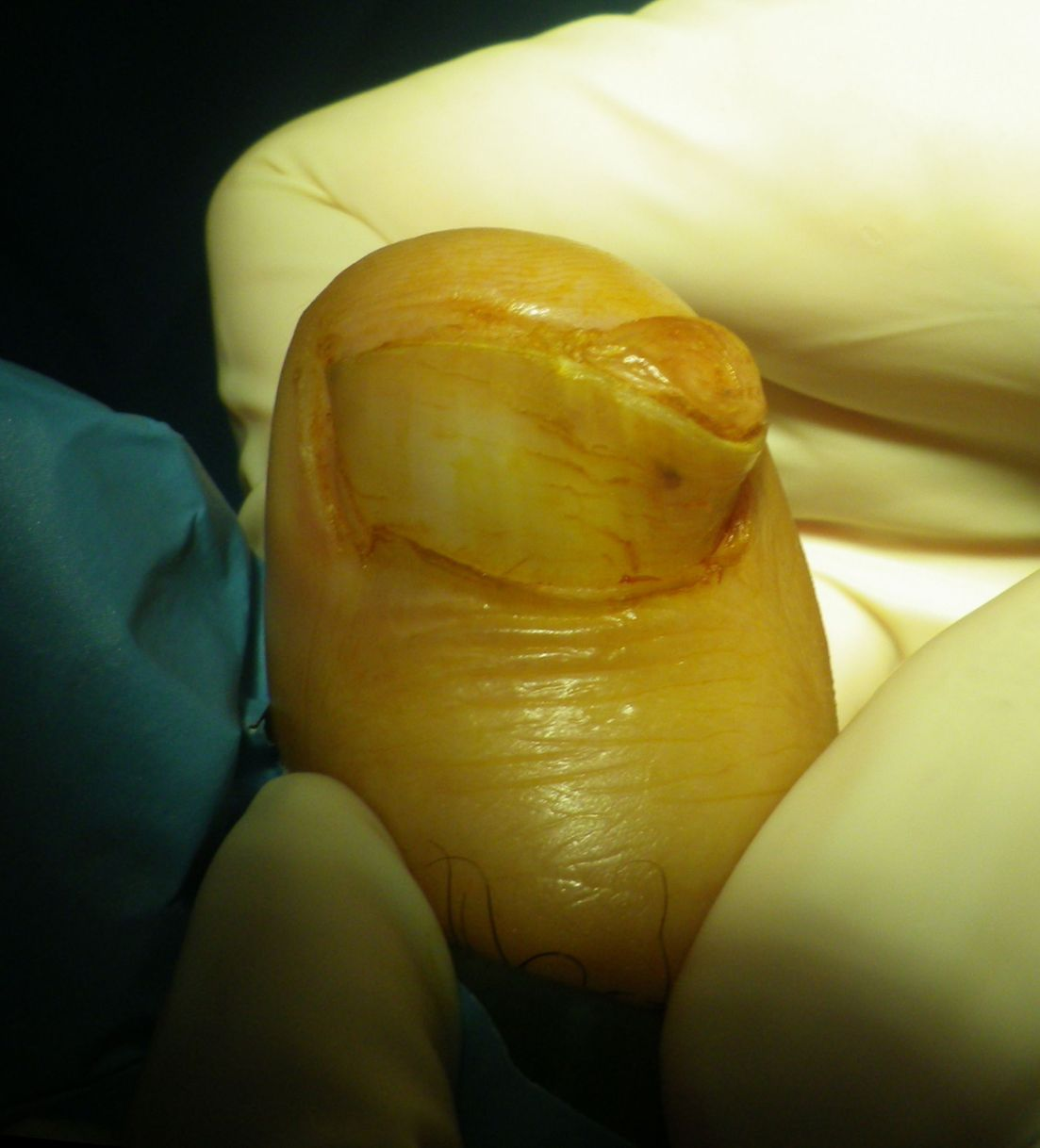
- Subungual exostosis (1/3), in a boy age 15 years
- Specialty: Orthopedics

Subungual exostosis is a type of non-cancerous bone tumor of the chondrogenic type, and consists of bone and cartilage. It usually projects from the upper surface of the big toe underlying the nailbed, giving rise to a painful swelling that destroys the nail. Subsequent ulceration and infection may occur.

There is an association with trauma and infection. Diagnosis involves medical imaging to exclude other similar conditions, particularly osteochondroma. X-ray appearance may reveal a bony protuberance attached to the top or side surface of a toe bone.

Treatment is by surgical excision and is effective.

More than half are under the age of 18 years and males are affected equally to females. Combined with bizarre parosteal osteochondromatous proliferation, they comprise <5% of cartilage tumors.

== Signs and symptoms ==
They tend to be painful due to the pressure applied to the nail bed and plate. They can involve destruction of the nail bed. These lesions are not true osteochondromas, rather it is a reactive cartilage metaplasia. The reason it occurs on the dorsal aspect is because the periosteum is loose dorsally but very tightly adherent volarly.

== Diagnosis ==
Diagnosis involves medical imaging.

Differential diagnosis includes mainly bizarre parosteal osteochondromatous proliferation (BPOP), which is more irregular and tends to involve the middle of the finger or toe rather than the end near the nail. They are distinct from subungual osteochondroma.

== Treatment ==
Treatment is by surgical excision and is effective.

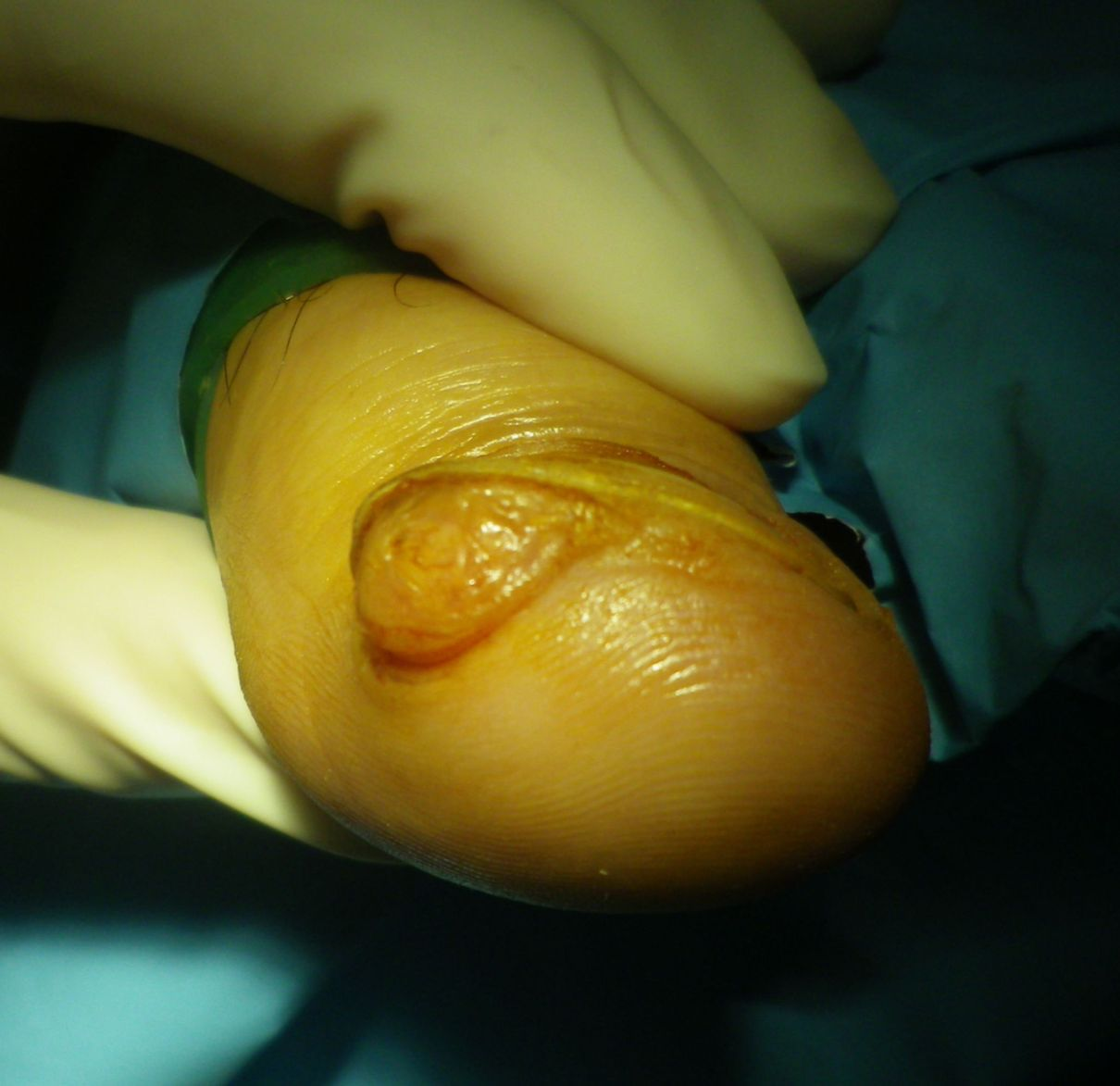
Subungual exostosis (2/3)

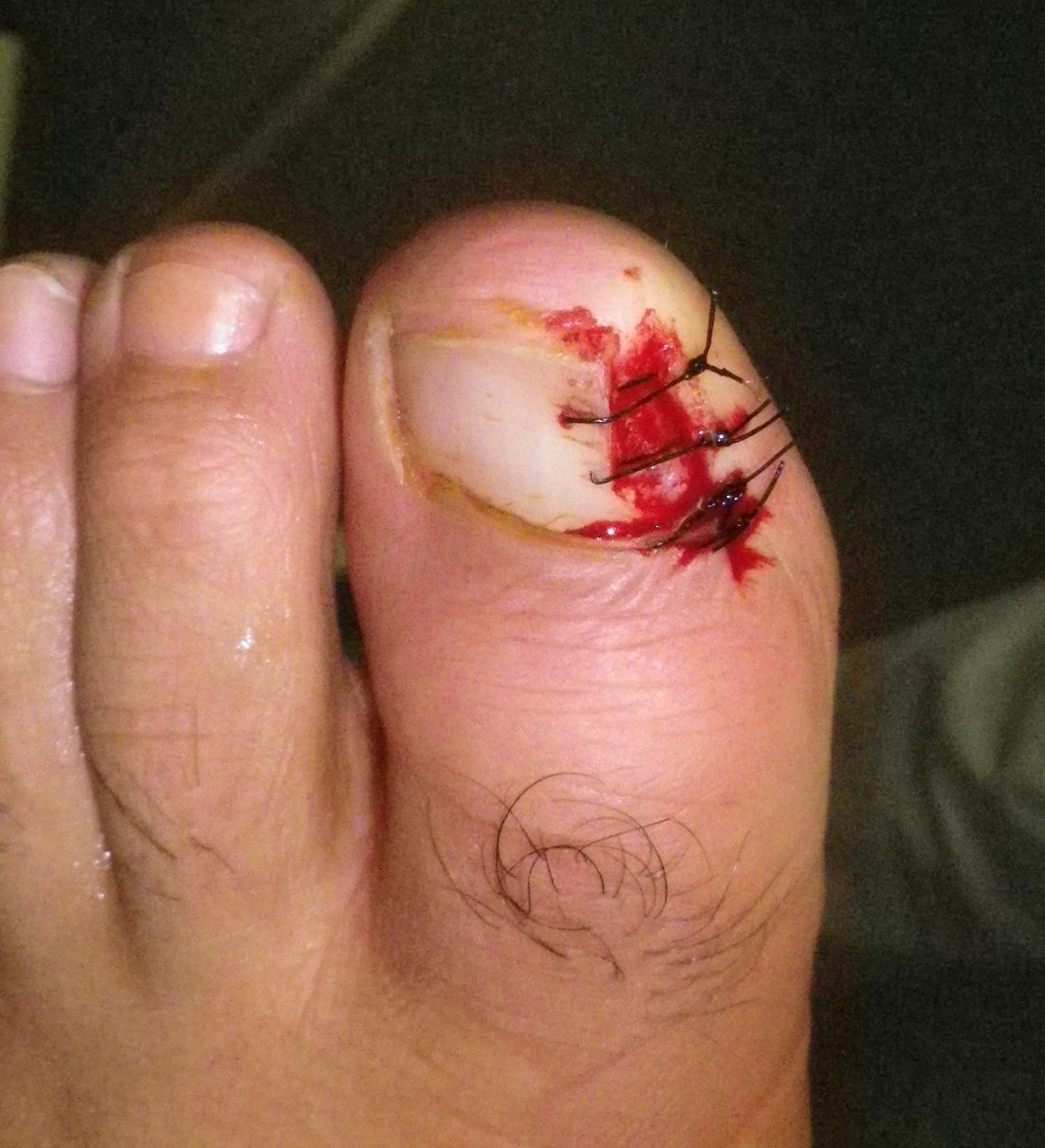
Subungual exostosis (3/3), after excision

== Epidemiology ==
It tends to occur in children and adolescents. Combined with BPOP, they account for less than 5% of cartilage tumors.

== See also ==
- Sternal cleft
- List of cutaneous conditions
