= Bizarre parosteal osteochondromatous proliferation =

- Other names: Nora lesion or Nora disease
- Specialty: Orthopedics
- Symptoms: Painless lump in finger or toe
- Risk factors: Possibly trauma in a minority
- Diagnostic method: Medical imaging
- Differential diagnosis: Mainly subungal exostosis
- Treatment: Surgical excision.
- Prognosis: Up to 50% recur after surgery
- Frequency: Rare, <5% of cartilage tumors, M=F

Bizarre parosteal osteochondromatous proliferation (BPOP), also known as Nora's lesion, is a type of non-cancerous bone tumor belonging to the group of cartilage tumors. It is generally seen in the tubular bones of the hands and feet, where it presents with a rapidly enlarging lump in a finger or toe which may be painful while growing.

It is composed of bone, cartilage and spindle cells. Some people report previous trauma.

Diagnosis is by medical imaging. Treatment is by surgical excision. Up to 50% recur after surgery.

It is rare, and occurs more often in the 20s and 30s. Combined with subungal exostosis, it accounts for less than 5% of cartilage tumors. Males and females are affected equally. The condition was first described by Frederick E. Nora in 1983.

== Signs and symptoms ==
BPOP generally presents with a 1–3 cm painless lump in a finger or more frequently a toe. Growth can be rapid.

== Mechanism ==
It is composed of bone, cartilage and spindle cells. A small number of people have reported previous trauma.

== Diagnosis ==
Medical imaging usually shows a well-defined wide-based bony growth on the surface of bone.

=== Differential diagnosis ===
BPOP is distinct from subungal exostosis. Conditions that may appear similar to BPOP include: myositis ossficans, ostechondroma, surface osteosarcoma and granulomatous infection.

== Treatment ==
Treatment is by surgical excision.

== Outcomes ==
Up to 50% recur after surgery.

== Epidemiology ==
BPOP is rare. It is most often seen in people in their 20s and 30s. Combined with subungal exostosis, it accounts for less than 5% of cartilage tumors. Males and females are affected equally.

== History ==
Bizarre parosteal osteochondromatous proliferation was first described by Frederick E. Nora in 1983. Generally in the US, it has been thought of as a mouthful and hence it is sometimes referred to as Nora's lesion.

== Other animals ==
In 1998 a report of a similar lesion to BPOP was reported in a wallaby.
