= Bone cyst =

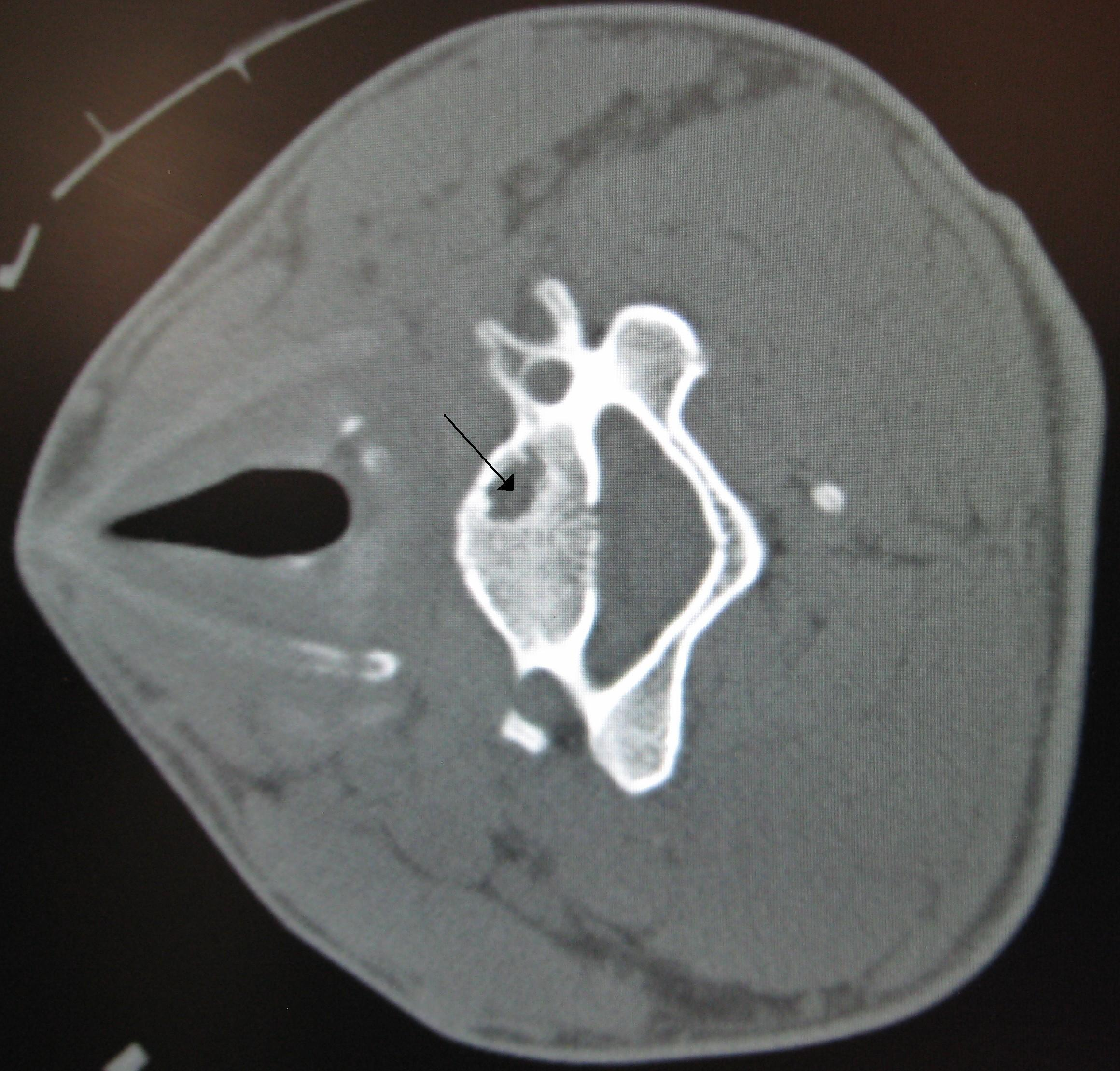
- A bone cyst in the vertebra of the neck, as seen on CT.
- Specialty: Orthopedic surgery, rheumatology
- Usual onset: Adolescence
- Types: Simple bone cyst, aneurysmal bone cyst, traumatic bone cyst, epidermoid bone cyst
- Causes: Trauma, unknown
- Diagnostic method: Medical imaging, biopsy
- Differential diagnosis: Bone tumors (benign or malignant)

A bone cyst, or geode, is a cyst that forms in bone. They are benign and can be found in various bones in the body. Bone cysts may or may not contain fluid. Although many types of bone cysts may be associated with trauma, the cause is often unknown. Types include simple bone cysts, aneurysmal bone cysts, traumatic bone cysts, and epidermoid bone cysts.

== Causes ==
Bone cysts are most commonly found in adolescents. The simple bone cyst (also known as a unicameral or solitary bone cyst) is a common, benign, fluid-filled lesion, most frequently found in the metaphysis of long bones, typically the proximal humerus or the top part of the femur. They are twice as common in males as in females. 1 out of 10,000 children is diagnosed with a simple bone cyst every year. Pathologic fractures are common as a result of the weaker bone, often with minor trauma. These cysts can commonly recur but are not typically associated with bone tumors. The cause is unknown.

Aneurysmal bone cysts are benign, fluid-filled lesions that can affect any bone. More than half occur in the metaphysis of long bones (especially the femur and tibia) and between 12 and 30% in the spine. Aneurysmal cysts are more likely to be diagnosed in females than males. The cause is also unknown, but may be associated with bone development due to their location near growth plates.

The traumatic bone cyst, also referred to as a hemorrhagic cyst, is a pseudocyst that most commonly affects the mandible of young individuals. It is a benign, typically empty cavity within the mandible body that does not have evidence of a true epithelial lining. This type of bone cyst is a condition found in the long bones and jaws. There is no definitive cause, though it relates to trauma in the oral region. There is no significant difference in incidence between males and females.

Epidermoid bone cysts are rare lesions as a result of trauma, located only in the phalanx or skull. In the hand, epithelial tissue from the nail bed forms a hard, fluid-filled cyst following trauma.

Other cyst-like lesions include osteitis fibrosa cystica, a bone disorder with a known cause involving hormones. These are not bone cysts, because they are composed of fibrous tissue and not fluid-filled.

== Signs and symptoms ==
Many bone cysts are incidental findings from routine exams or imaging for other reasons. Simple bone cysts are typically asymptomatic until the affected bone is broken. Individuals are at a higher risk of fracture, including from a minor injury, because the cyst causes the outer layer of bone to thin. Aneurysmal bone cysts are also often only diagnosed following a pathologic fracture. Some may experience pain, swelling, decreased range of motion. Bone cysts in the spine can cause back pain, limited mobility, and other neurological symptoms, such as a radiculopathy. Epidermoid bone cysts transilluminate when a flashlight is pointed at the affected area, such as the fingertip.

== Diagnosis ==
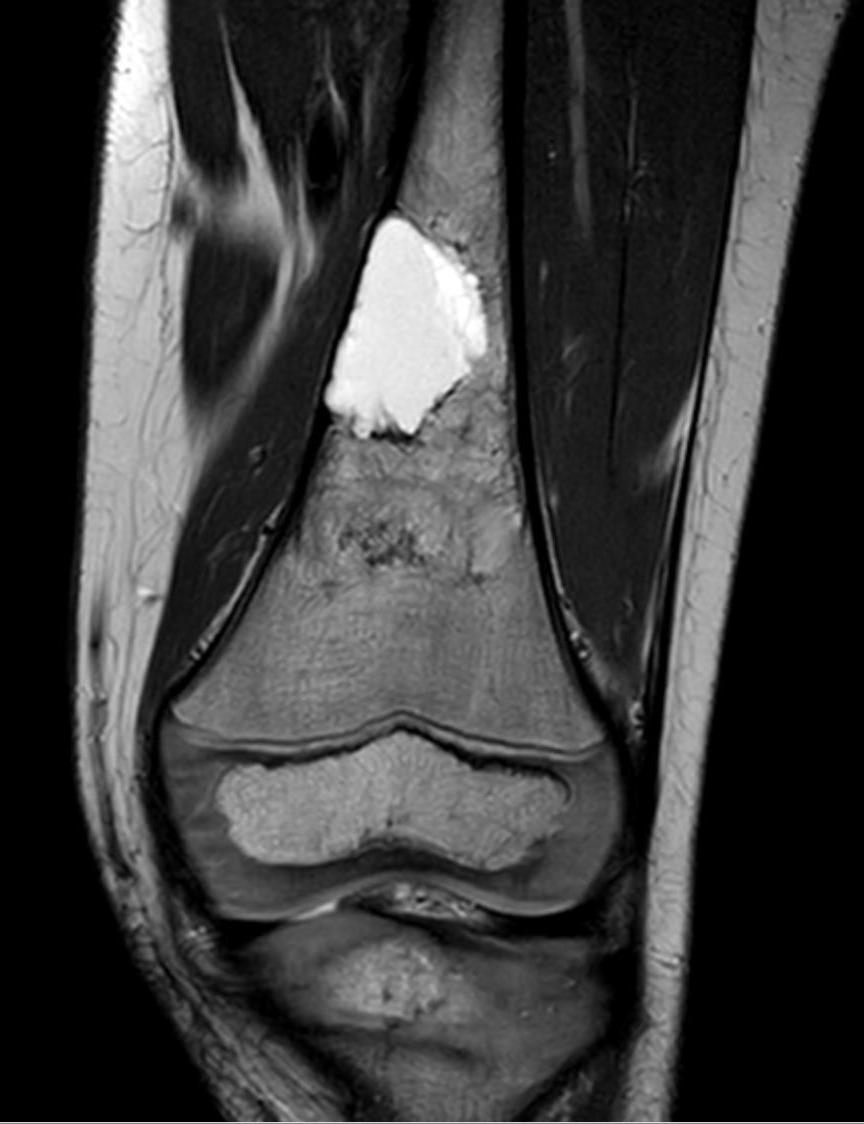
MRI of a partially healed bone cyst of the femur in a juvenile patient following a pathologic fracture and hemorrhage.

Aneurysmal bone cysts will appear as an empty space on X-ray with thinned surrounding bone. An MRI can better visualize the exact boundaries of the cyst and fluid inside indicative of an aneurysmal bone cyst. On CT scans, aneurysmal bone cysts have a radiodensity of 20 Hounsfield units (HU) or less and are osteolytic. In contrast, intraosseous lipomas have a lower radiodensity of -40 to -60 HU. A biopsy is necessary for diagnosis, either via a core needle biopsy or open biopsy.

Simple bone cysts may appear similar to sarcomas on X-ray. Therefore, further imaging, needle aspiration, or a biopsy may be necessary for diagnosis.

Traumatic bone cysts appear on X-ray as a single bright area with an irregular but well-defined outline.

== Treatment and prevention ==
=== Simple (unicameral) bone cyst ===
Some simple bone cysts may spontaneously resolve without medical intervention, including after skeletal maturity. Specific treatments are determined based on the size of the cyst, the strength of the bone, medical history, extent of the disease, activity level, symptoms an individual is experiencing, and tolerance for specific medications, procedures, or therapies. The types of methods used to treat this type of cyst are curettage and bone grafting, aspiration, steroid injections, and bone marrow injections. Watchful waiting and activity modifications are the most common nonsurgical treatments that will help resolve and help prevent unicameral bone cysts from occurring and reoccurring.

=== Aneurysmal bone cyst ===
Aneurysmal bone cysts can be treated with a variety of different methods. These methods include open curettage and bone grafting with or without adjuvant therapy, cryotherapy, sclerotherapy, ethibloc injections, radionuclide ablation, and selective arterial embolization. En bloc resection and reconstruction with strut grafting are the most common treatments and procedures that prevent recurrences of this type of cyst.

=== Traumatic bone cyst ===
The traumatic bone cyst treatment consists of surgical exploration, curettage of the osseous socket and bony walls, subsequent filling with blood, and intralesional steroid injections. Young athletes can reduce their risk of traumatic bone cyst by wearing protective mouth wear or protective headgear.

== History ==
Aneurysmal bone cysts were described in 1893 by surgeon William Van Arsdale, who called these lesions "homerus ossifying haematoma". In 1940, pathologist James Ewing used the term "aneurismal" to describe these lesions. Pathologists Henry Jaffé and Louis Lichtenstein first coined the term "aneurismal cyst" in 1942. In 1950, they modified this term to "aneurismal bone cyst". They may be associated with bone tumors. Simple bone cysts were first recognized as a distinct entity in 1910. Jaffe and Lichtenstein also provided a detailed discussion of simple bone cysts in 1942. Traumatic bone cysts were first described by oral surgeons Carl D. Lucas and Theodor Blum in 1929.
