= Frederick E. Nora =

American pathologist (born 1952)

Frederick E. Nora (born 1952 in Chicago) is an American pathologist, who completed his residency at the Mayo Clinic, Rochester, and in 1983 was the first to author an original paper on bizarre parosteal osteochondromatous proliferation, also known as Nora disease.
