= Osteoma =

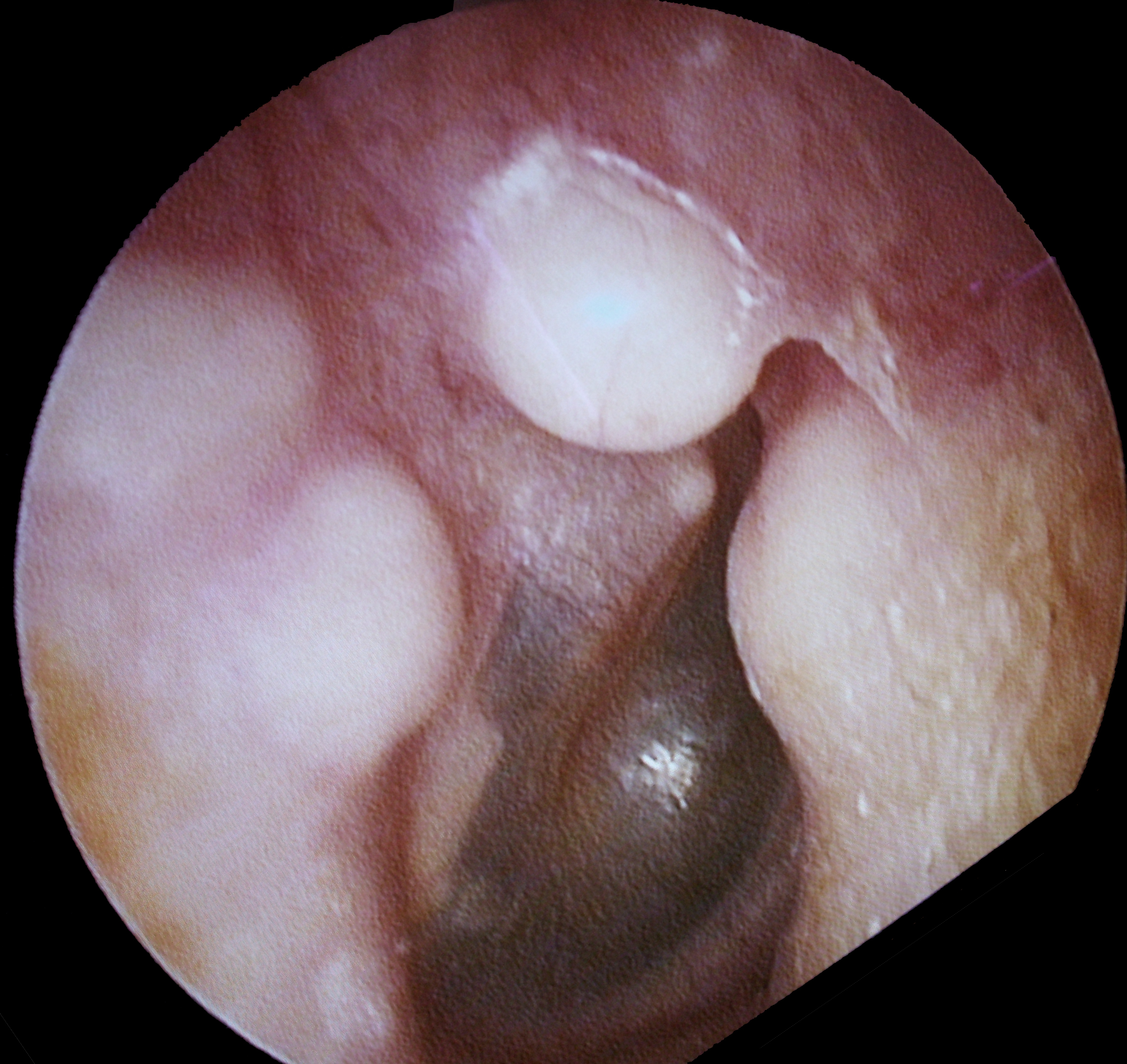
- Osteoma of external auditory meatus
- Specialty: Oncology

An osteoma (plural osteomas or less commonly osteomata) is a new piece of bone usually growing as a benign tumour on another piece of bone, typically the skull. When grown on other bone it is known as "homoplastic osteoma"; on other tissue it is called "heteroplastic osteoma".

Osteoma represents the most common benign neoplasm of the nose and paranasal sinuses. The cause of osteomas is uncertain, but commonly accepted theories propose embryologic, traumatic, or infectious causes. They are present in Gardner's syndrome.

Larger craniofacial osteomas may cause facial pain, headache, and infection due to obstructed nasofrontal ducts. Often, craniofacial osteoma presents itself through ocular signs and symptoms (such as proptosis).

== Variants ==
- Osteoma cutis (also known as "Albright's hereditary osteodystrophy")
- Osteoid osteoma
- Fibro-osteoma
- Chondro-osteoma
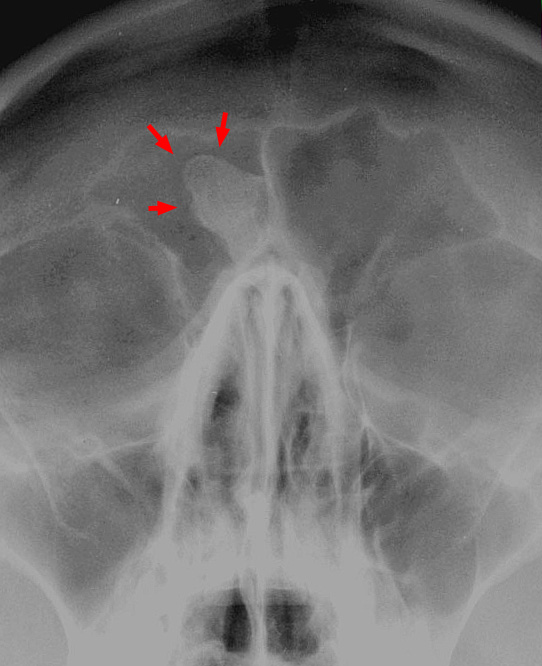
Osteoma of the frontal sinus seen on x-ray

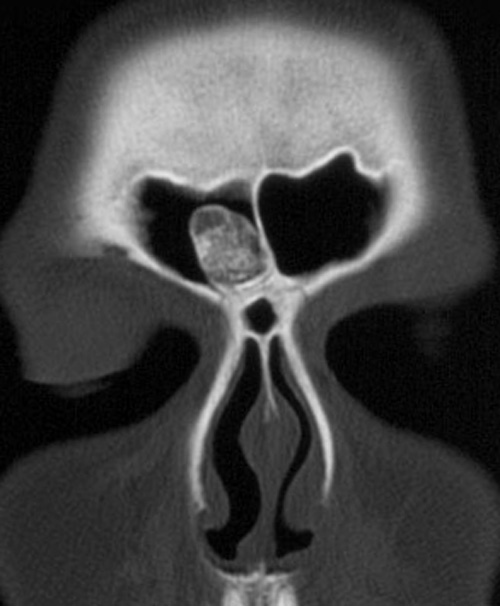
Osteoma of the frontal sinus on CT

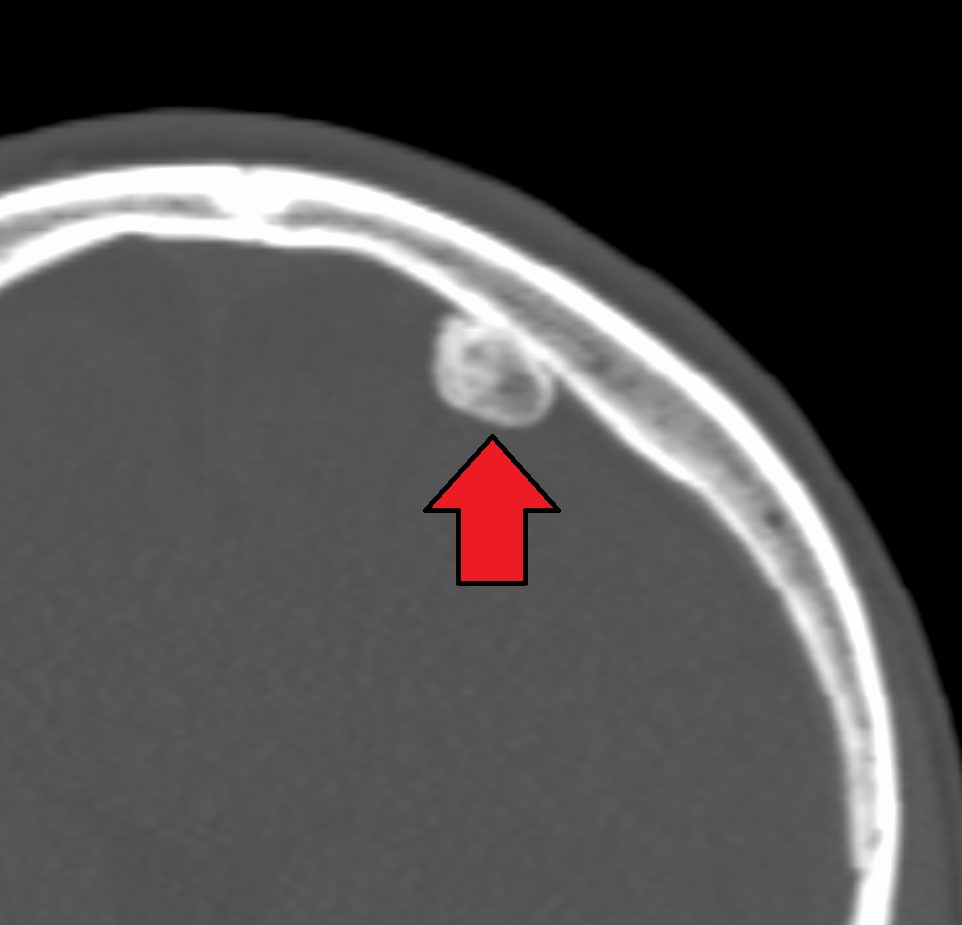
Osteoma

== See also ==
- Osteosclerosis
- Familial adenomatous polyposis
- Exostosis
- Gardner syndrome
- Ganglion cyst
