= Curettage =

Use of a curette to remove tissue

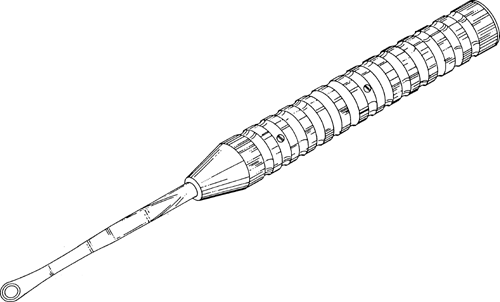
- Illustration from a United States patent for an ornate curette (Michelson, 1988)
- ICD-9-CM: 69.0
- MeSH: D003475

Curettage (/ˌkjʊərɪˈtɑːʒ/ or /kjʊəˈrɛtɪdʒ/), in medical procedures, is the use of a curette (French, meaning "scoop") to remove tissue by scraping or scooping.

Curettages are also a method of abortion. It has been replaced by vacuum aspiration over the last decade.

Curettage has been used to treat teeth affected by periodontitis.

Gingival curettage is a surgical procedure designed to remove the soft tissue lining of the periodontal pocket with a curet, leaving only a gingival connective tissue lining. ... Gingival curettage, as originally conceived, was designed to promote new connective tissue attachment to the tooth, by the removal of pocket lining and junctional epithelium. Since there is no evidence that gingival curettage has any therapeutic benefit in the treatment of chronic periodontitis, the American Dental Association has deleted that code from the fourth edition of Current Dental Terminology (CDT-4). In addition, the American Academy of Periodontology, in its Guidelines for Periodontal Therapy, did not include gingival curettage as a method of treatment. This indicates that the dental community as a whole regards gingival curettage as a procedure with no clinical value.

Curettage is also a major method used for removing osteoid osteoma and osteoblastoma.

Curettage with subsequent culture is more accurate than ulcer base swan culture or aspiration and culture for diabetic foot ulcers.

Curettage is also used when excising a chalazion of the eyelid.

== See also ==
- Dilation and curettage
- Electrodesiccation and curettage
- Endocervical curettage
