= Sonalleve MR-HIFU =

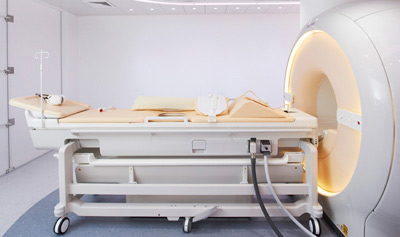
Sonalleve HIFU

Sonalleve MR-HIFU is a medical system developed by Philips Healthcare for the treatment of uterine fibroids without surgery. The system uses non-invasive high-intensity focused ultrasound (HIFU) guided by magnetic resonance (MR), hence the acronym MR-HIFU. The procedure involves volumetric heating of fibroids with real-time feedback. In June 2017, Philips and Profound Medical announced an agreement to transfer Philips' MR-HIFU business, which includes the Sonalleve system, to Profound Medical.

== Technology overview ==
The Sonalleve high frequency focused ultrasound uses a special transducer to focus a beam of ultrasound waves on to the fibroid located within the body. The focused ultrasound waves generate high temperatures within smaller areas. The temperature when maintained for sufficient a period of time results in the ablation of the fibroids. The therapy procedure is guided by Magnetic Resonance Imaging (MRI) with real time feedback, which helps in the focused ablation of the target location. The real-time feedback loop ensures that adequate heating takes place, treating every bit of tissue that has been targeted and volumetric ablation (a Philips proprietary technology) helps treat larger volumes efficiently and quickly.

== Device approvals ==
The Sonalleve is approved for treating uterine fibroids in Europe, most of Asia, the Middle East and South America. Philips has received CE Marking for its Sonalleve MR-HIFU system. Equivalent to Food and Drug Administration (FDA) approval in the U.S., CE Marking is recognized by countries in the European Economic Area, Asia, South America and Africa and signifies that a product complies with the essential requirements of relevant health, safety and environmental protection legislation.

The company has also applied for FDA approval for the system. The process for clinical trials and study are already underway. The device is also approved for the treatment of bone metastasis and is undergoing development for the treatment of prostate cancer and breast cancer.

== Treatment procedure ==
The method is quicker and comfortable compared to the conventional procedures currently done for the treatment of uterine fibroids such as hysterectomy, myomectomy or uterine artery embolization. The procedure is usually done on an outpatient basis with the patient leaving the hospital on the same day. The patient may be kept for observation for another 24 hours.

The procedure is performed in three stages:

=== Planning stage ===
The patients are evaluated using three dimensional MR imaging which is used to determine if the patient is eligible for treatment. If the patient satisfies the criteria for treatment, the condition is evaluated and the treatment time is planned accordingly. The patient arrives at the stipulated time and is placed in a prone position on the MRI table. The device is positioned correctly so as to achieve acoustic coupling and the regions of treatment are marked using the MR images. The patient may also be given IV fluids or conscious sedatives. A test delivery of a non lethal dose of ultrasound waves may also be focused to ensure accuracy.

=== Non-invasive treatment stage ===
High-intensity ultrasound waves are focused onto the fibroids which elevates its temperature and causes the tissue to coagulate. The process is done in multiple sonications with the number and duration depending on the size and extent of fibroids. The process will be closely monitored and controlled by MR imaging and feedback to confirm the accuracy and effectiveness of the treatment. In case of any discomfort, the patient can stop the process through a hand held device button.

=== Therapy verification stage ===
At the end of treatment, contrast enhanced MR imaging is used to assess the effectiveness of the procedure. These images are used to determine the Non-Perfused Volume (NPV) of the fibroid, which is the volume of tissue that is non-viable (has no blood flow to it).

== Treatment setup ==
The Sonalleve MR-HIFU system uses the Philips Achieva 1.5T, 3.0T MR, 3.0T TX or Philips Ingenia 1.5T, 3.0T platform, and comprises the following interconnected subsystems:

- Achieva MR system to monitor the procedure and provide real-time images
- MR-HIFU patient tabletop with integrated MR compatible high power phased array transducer with mechanical and electronic positioning
- MR-HIFU therapy console to plan treatment, calculate real-time temperature maps, and control HIFU delivery
- HIFU electronics for ultrasound power (energy) delivery and beam positioning

== Treatment benefits ==
For the doctors it offers easy planning, treatment with real-time feedback and a solution to those who would otherwise decline surgical treatment. For the patients it offers an alternative non-invasive treatment mechanism involving no anesthesia and a short recovery time.

== Locations ==
The system was initially installed in about 16 locations in the U.S., Europe and Asia for research purposes. Philips has installed around 50 of its Sonalleve MR-HIFU systems worldwide with most of the systems in Asia and Europe.

India has seven installed systems in five cities. Apollo Hospitals has the setup installed at three of its facilities Chennai, Bangalore and New Delhi. The treatment is also available in Clumax Diagnostics, Bangalore, Bharat Scans, Chennai, SRL Jankharia Imaging, Mumbai and Sunrise Hospital, Kochi.

S No	Name of center	Location	City	State
1	Indraprastha Apollo Hospital	Sarita Vihar	New Delhi	National Capital Region
2	Apollo Specialty Hospital and Cancer Centre	Teynampet	Chennai	Tamil Nadu
3	Apollo Hospital	Bannerghatta Road	Bangalore	Karnataka
4	SRL Jankharia's Imaging Centre	Girgaon	Mumbai	Maharashtra
5	Bharat Scans Private Limited	Royapettah	Chennai	Tamil Nadu
6	Medall's Clumax Diagnostics Centre	Sadhashivanagar	Bangalore	Karnataka
7	Sunrise Hospital	Kakkanad	Kochi	Kerala

== See also ==
- High-intensity focused ultrasound
- Philips
- Hysterectomy
- Myomectomy
