= Osteoid osteoma =

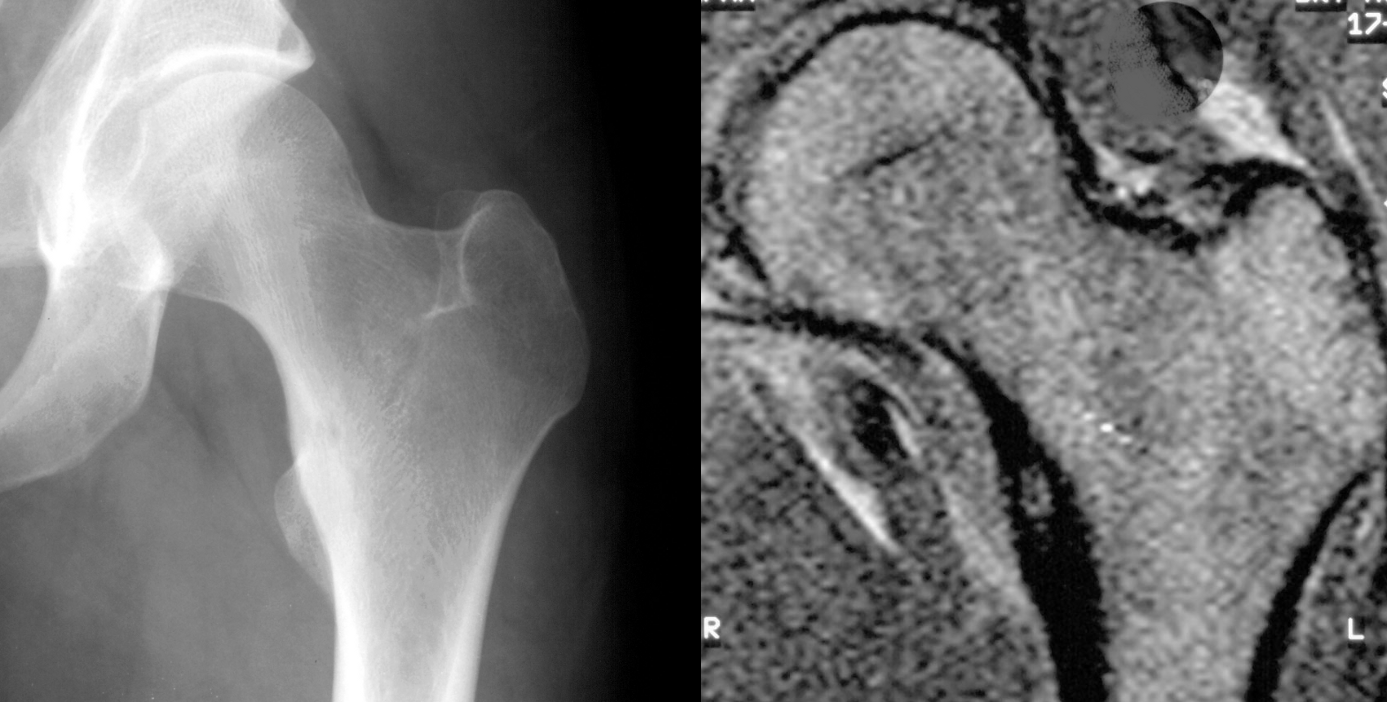
- Osteoid osteoma of the lesser trochanter: X-ray and MRI with marked sclerosis around the nidus
- Specialty: Oncology

An osteoid osteoma is a benign (non-cancerous) bone tumor that arises from osteoblasts and some components of osteoclasts. It was originally thought to be a smaller version of an osteoblastoma. Osteoid osteomas tend to be less than 1.5 cm in size. The tumor can be in any bone in the body but are most common in long bones, such as the femur and tibia. They account for 10 to 12 percent of all benign bone tumors and 2 to 3 percent of all abnormal bone growths. Osteoid osteomas may occur at any age, and are most common in patients between the ages of 4 and 25 years old. Males are affected approximately three times more commonly than females. Osteoid osteomas are different than osteomas, which are rather found in older patients and localized in the skull.

== Signs and symptoms ==
Common symptoms of an osteoid osteoma are:

- dull or sharp pain that worsens at night
- pain that is usually relieved by aspirin or other anti-inflammatory drugs
- limping
- painful scoliosis and muscle spasticity (when the tumor is located in the spine)
- growth disturbance (when the tumor is involved with a bone's growth plate)
- muscle wasting
- bowing deformity
- nerve symptoms like sciatica (when the tumor is located in the spine)

The most common symptom is pain that can be relieved with over the counter pain medication in the beginning. After the benign tumor develops further the pain can not be alleviated with medication and minor to severe swelling starts to occur. Although, in some cases the pain level remains the same for years, and regular NSAIDs intake keeps the pain at bay. The tumor is often found through x-ray imaging. Conventional radiographs reveal a well-demarcated lytic lesion (nidus) surrounded by a distinct zone of sclerosis that allow doctors to identify the tumor.

Characterized by being less than 1.5 cm in diameter, osteoid osteomas most frequently occur in young men (male:female ratio 3:1) and may occur in any bone of the body, most frequently around the knee but often also seen in the vertebrae, in the long bones and less commonly in the mandible or other craniofacial bones.

Severe pain typically occurs at night, but can also be constant at any time of day. The chief complaint may only be of dull pain which is non radiating and persistent throughout 24 hours but increases significantly at night. Pain tends to be relieved with NSAIDs such as ibuprofen.

== Histological findings ==
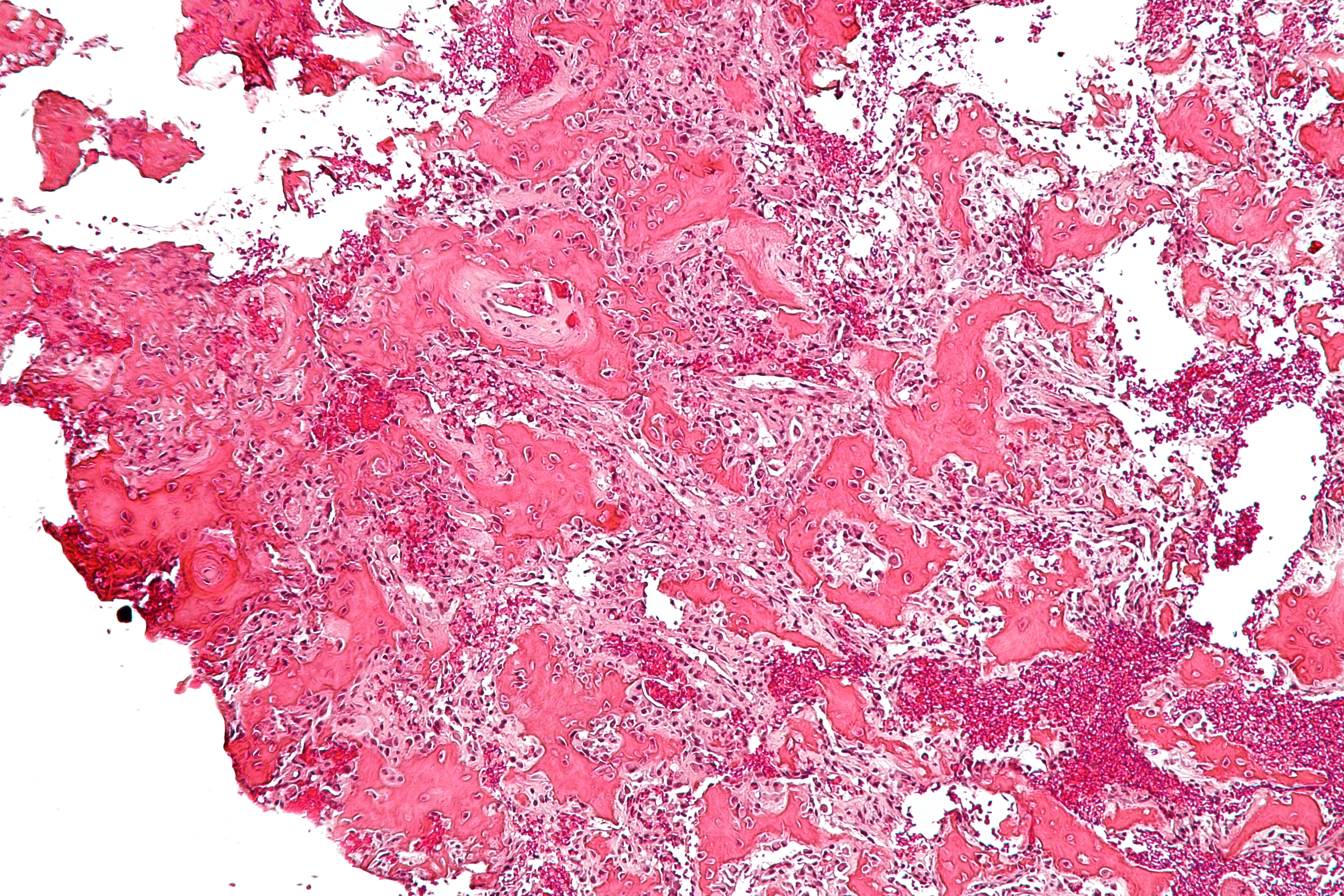
Micrograph of an osteoid osteoma showing the characteristic anastomosing bony trabeculae and osteoblastic rimming. H&E stain.

On histological examination, osteoid osteoma consists of a small (< 1.5–2 cm), yellowish-to-red nidus of osteoid and woven bone with interconnected trabeculae, and a background and rim of highly vascularized, fibrous connective tissue. Varying degrees of sclerotic bone reaction may surround the lesion. Benign osteoblastoma is virtually indistinguishable from osteoid osteoma. The usual appearance included a fibrovascular stroma with numerous osteoblasts, osteoid tissue, well-formed woven bone, and giant cells. The osteoblasts were generally small and regular in shape.

== Diagnosis ==
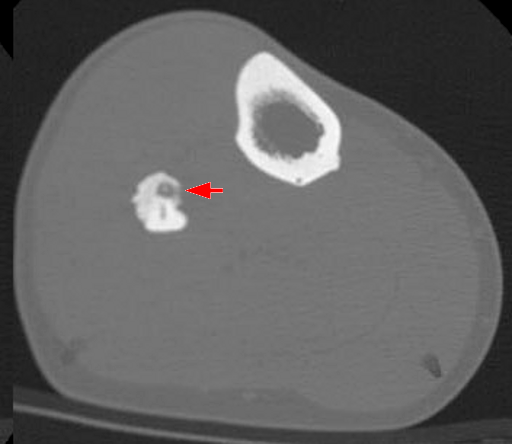
CT scan showing an osteoid osteoma of the fibula with a clearly visible nidus

Radiographs in osteoid osteoma typically show a round lucency, containing a dense sclerotic central nidus (the characteristic lesion in this kind of tumor) surrounded by sclerotic bone. The nidus is seldom larger than 1.5 cm.

The lesion can in most cases be detected on CT scan, bone scans and angiograms. Plain radiographs are not always diagnostic. MRI adds little to the CT findings which are useful for localisation. Radionuclide scanning shows intense uptake which is useful for localisation at surgery using a hand held detector, and for confirmation that the entire lesion has been removed.

== Treatment ==
Treatment varies based on the health of the patient. If the patient is otherwise healthy and is not significantly bothered by the pain, the tumor is treated symptomatically with nonsteroidal anti-inflammatory drugs. If this therapy fails or the location of the tumor could lead to growth disturbances, scoliosis, or osteoarthritis, surgical or percutaneous ablation may be considered. If surgery is preferred, the patient may be referred to a specialist or an orthopedic surgeon to perform the procedure. Post-surgery therapy and strengthening may be needed, depending on the tumor location and health of the patient. While shown to be effective, surgical resection has many potential complications, including difficult intraoperative identification of the tumor, local recurrence from incomplete resection, and resection of weight bearing bone that can necessitate prolonged hospital stays and complicate recovery.

Recently, CT guided radiofrequency ablation has emerged as a less invasive alternative to surgical resection. In this technique, which can be performed under conscious sedation, an RF probe is introduced into the tumor nidus through a cannulated needle under CT guidance and heat is applied locally to destroy tumor cells. Since the procedure was first introduced for the treatment of osteoid osteomas in the early 1990s, it has been shown in numerous studies to be less invasive and expensive, to result in less bone destruction and to have equivalent safety and efficacy to surgical techniques, with 66 to 96% of patients reporting freedom from symptoms. While initial success rates with RFA are high, symptom recurrence after RFA treatment has been reported, with some studies demonstrating a recurrence rate similar to that of surgical treatment.

As early as 2014, treatment has been demonstrated with incisionless surgery utilizing an MRI to guide high-intensity ultrasound waves to destroy an osteoid osteoma. This treatment, high-intensity focused ultrasound (MR-HIFU), is an image-guided technique combining high intensity focused ultrasound ablation with real time monitoring of temperature change during the procedure. On November 27, 2020, the Food and Drug Administration approved the Sonalleve MR-HIFU system for the treatment of osteoid osteoma in the extremities.

Clinical results support the probable benefit of Sonalleve MR-HIFU system for the ablation of painful osteoid osteoma. Efficacy was evaluated in a study of nine patients treated with MR-HIFU, without technical difficulties or serious adverse events. There was a statistically significant decrease in their pain scores within 4 weeks of treatment. No pain medication usage was achieved in 8 of 9 patients after 4 weeks.
