= Traumatic bone cyst =

- Specialty: Simple bone cyst

Traumatic bone cyst, also called a simple bone cyst, is a condition of the jaws. It is more likely to affect men and is more likely to occur in people in their first and second decades. There is no known cause though it is sometimes related to trauma. It appears on radiographs as a well-circumscribed radiolucency (dark area), and it commonly scallops between the roots of teeth. When the lesion is surgically opened, an empty cavity is found.

One study showed female predominance.
