= Chondromyxoid fibroma =

Type of cartilage tumor

- Specialty: Oncology

Chondromyxoid fibroma is a rare type of cartilage tumor which rarely occurs in the skull or skull base.

Most cases are characterised by GRM1 gene fusion or promoter swapping. It can be associated with a translocation at t(1;5)(p13;p13).
