= Bone tumor =

Abnormal growth of tissue within bone

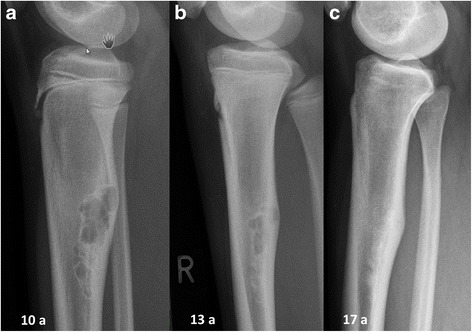
- Non-ossifying fibroma of tibia
- Specialty: Orthopedics
- Symptoms: Lump, pain, neurological signs, unexplained broken bone, fatigue, fever, weight loss, anemia and nausea. Sometimes no symptoms
- Types: Noncancerous (benign) or cancerous (malignant)
- Diagnostic method: Medical imaging, biopsy
- Prognosis: Varies with type
- Frequency: Common

A bone tumor is an abnormal growth of tissue in bone. Cancerous bone tumors usually originate from a cancer in another part of the body such as from lung, breast, thyroid, kidney and prostate. There may be a lump, pain, or neurological signs from pressure. A bone tumor might present with a pathologic fracture. Other symptoms may include fatigue, fever, weight loss, anemia and nausea. Sometimes there are no symptoms and the tumor is found when investigating another problem.

Diagnosis is generally by X-ray and other radiological tests such as CT scan, MRI, PET scan and bone scintigraphy. Blood tests might include a complete blood count, inflammatory markers, serum electrophoresis, PSA, kidney function and liver function. Urine may be tested for Bence Jones protein. For confirmation of diagnosis, a biopsy for histological evaluation might be required.

The most common bone tumor is a non-ossifying fibroma. Average five-year survival in the United States after being diagnosed with bone and joint cancer is 68%. The earliest known bone tumor was an osteosarcoma in a foot bone discovered in South Africa, between 1.6 and 1.8 million years ago.

== Classification ==
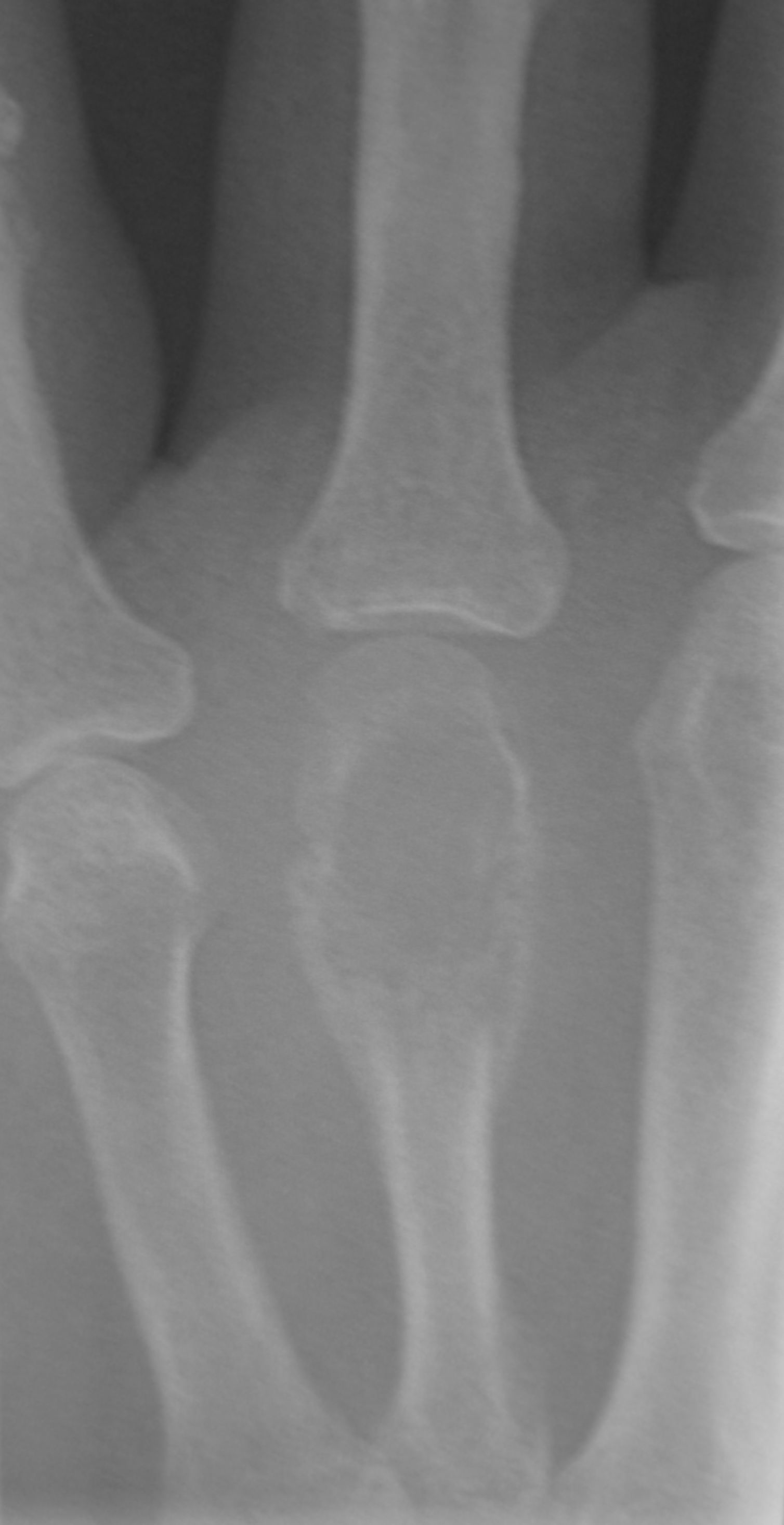
X-ray of a giant cell bone tumor in the head of the 4th metacarpal of the left hand

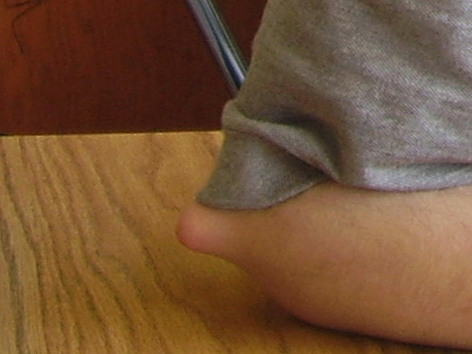
An arm bone tumor

Bone tumors are traditionally classified as noncancerous (benign) or cancerous (malignant). Several features of bone tumors and soft tissue tumors overlap. Their classification was revised by the World Health Organization (WHO) in 2020. This newer classification categorises bone tumors into cartilage tumors, osteogenic tumors, fibrogenic tumors, vascular tumors of bone, osteoclastic giant cell-rich tumors, notochordal tumors, other mesenchymal tumors of bone, and hematopoietic neoplasms of bone.

Bone tumors may be classified as "primary tumors", which originate in bone or from bone-derived cells and tissues, and "secondary tumors" which originate in other sites and spread (metastasize) to the skeleton. Carcinomas of the prostate, breasts, lungs, thyroid, and kidneys are the carcinomas that most commonly metastasize to bone. Secondary malignant bone tumors are estimated to be 50 to 100 times as common as primary bone cancers.

=== Primary bone tumors ===
Primary tumors of bone can be divided into benign tumors and cancers. Common benign bone tumors may be neoplastic, developmental, traumatic, infectious, or inflammatory in etiology. Some benign tumors are not true neoplasms, but rather, represent hamartomas, namely the osteochondroma. The most common locations for many primary tumors, both benign and malignant include the distal femur and proximal tibia (around the knee joint). Examples of benign bone tumors include osteoma, osteoid osteoma, osteochondroma, osteoblastoma, enchondroma, giant cell tumor of bone and aneurysmal bone cyst.

Malignant primary bone tumors, known as bone sarcomas, include osteosarcoma, chondrosarcoma, Ewing sarcoma, fibrosarcoma, and other types. While malignant fibrous histiocytoma (MFH) - now generally called "pleomorphic undifferentiated sarcoma" - primary in bone is known to occur occasionally, current paradigms tend to consider MFH a wastebasket diagnosis, and the current trend is toward using specialized studies (i.e. genetic and immunohistochemical tests) to classify these undifferentiated tumors into other tumor classes. Multiple myeloma is a hematologic cancer, originating in the bone marrow, which also frequently presents as one or more bone lesions.

Germ cell tumors, including teratoma, often present and originate in the midline of the sacrum, coccyx, or both. These sacrococcygeal teratomas are often relatively amenable to treatment.

=== Secondary bone tumors ===
Secondary bone tumors are metastatic lesions which have spread from other organs, most commonly carcinomas of the breast, lung, and prostate. Rarely, primary bone malignancies such as osteosarcoma may also spread to other bones. Reliable and valid statistics on the incidence, prevalence, and mortality of malignant bone tumors are difficult to come by, particularly in older adults (those over 75 years of age) - because carcinomas that are widely metastatic to bone are rarely ever curable. Biopsies to determine the origin of the tumor in cases like this are rarely done.

== Signs and symptoms ==
Clinical features of a bone tumor depend on the type of tumor and which part of which bone is affected. Symptoms and signs usually result from the pressure effect of the tumor.

There may be a lump, with or without pain. Pain may increase with the growth of the tumor and may be worse at night and at rest. A bone tumor might present with an unexplained broken bone; with little or no trauma. Additional symptoms may include fatigue, fever, weight loss, anemia and nausea. If the tumor presses a nerve, neurological signs may be present. Sometimes there are no symptoms and the tumor is found when investigating another problem.

== Diagnosis ==
A bone tumor may be felt on examination, following which a plain X-ray is usually carried out. Blood tests might include a complete blood count, inflammatory markers, serum electrophoresis, PSA, kidney function and liver function. Urine may be sent for Bence Jones protein. Other tests that might be requested include a CT scan, MRI, PET scan and bone scintigraphy. For confirmation of diagnosis, a biopsy for histological evaluation might be required, using either a needle or by incision (open biopsy).

=== Staging ===
Stage 1A bone cancer

Stage 1B bone cancer

Stage 2A bone cancer

Stage 2B bone cancer

Stage 3 bone cancer

== Treatment ==
Treatment of bone tumors is dependent on the type of tumor. Where available, people with bone tumors are treated at a specialist centre which have surgeons, radiologists, pathologists, oncologists and other support staff. Generally, noncancerous bone tumors may be observed for changes and surgery offered if there is pain or pressure effects on neighbouring body parts. Surgical resection with or without cytotoxic drugs may be considered. Treatment typically involves a multidisciplinary approach combining surgery, chemotherapy, and radiation therapy, tailored to the specific type, stage, and location of the cancer. Despite advances in medical technology and treatment protocols, bone cancer continues to present significant challenges for patients and healthcare providers alike.

=== Chemotherapy and radiotherapy ===
Chemotherapy and radiotherapy are effective in some tumors (such as Ewing's sarcoma) but less so in others (such as chondrosarcoma). There is a variety of chemotherapy treatment protocols for bone tumors. The protocol with the best-reported survival in children and adults is an intra-arterial protocol where tumor response is tracked by serial arteriogram. When tumor response has reached >90% necrosis surgical intervention is planned.

=== Medication ===
One of the major concerns is bone density and bone loss. Non-hormonal bisphosphonates increase bone strength and are available as once-a-week prescription pills. Strontium-89 chloride is an intravenous medication given to help with the pain and can be given in three-month intervals.

=== Surgical treatment ===
Treatment for some bone cancers may involve surgery, such as limb amputation, or limb sparing surgery (often in combination with chemotherapy and radiation therapy). Limb sparing surgery, or limb salvage surgery, means the limb is spared from amputation. Instead of amputation, the affected bone is removed and replaced in one of two ways: (a) bone graft, in which bone is taken from elsewhere on the body or (b) artificial bone is put in. In upper leg surgeries, limb salvage prostheses are available.

There are other joint preservation surgical reconstruction options, including allograft, tumor-devitalized autograft, vascularized fibula graft, distraction osteogenesis, and custom-made implants. An analysis of massive knee replacements after resection of primary bone tumors showed patients did not score as highly on the Musculoskeletal Tumour Society Score and Knee Society Score as patients who had undergone intra-articular resection.

=== Thermal ablation techniques ===
Over the past two decades, CT guided radiofrequency ablation has emerged as a less invasive alternative to surgical resection in the care of benign bone tumors, most notably osteoid osteomas. In this technique, which can be performed under conscious sedation, a RF probe is introduced into the tumor nidus through a cannulated needle under CT guidance and heat is applied locally to destroy tumor cells. Since the procedure was first introduced for the treatment of osteoid osteomas in the early 1990s, it has been shown in numerous studies to be less invasive and expensive, to result in less bone destruction and to have equivalent safety and efficacy to surgical techniques, with 66 to 96% of patients reporting freedom from symptoms. While initial success rates with RFA are high, symptom recurrence after RFA treatment has been reported, with some studies demonstrating a recurrence rate similar to that of surgical treatment.

Thermal ablation techniques are also increasingly being used in the palliative treatment of painful metastatic bone disease. Currently, external beam radiation therapy is the standard of care for patients with localized bone pain due to metastatic disease. Although the majority of patients experience complete or partial relief of pain following radiation therapy, the effect is not immediate and has been shown in some studies to be transient in more than half of patients. For patients who are not eligible or do not respond to traditional therapies ( i.e. radiation therapy, chemotherapy, palliative surgery, bisphosphonates or analgesic medications), thermal ablation techniques have been explored as alternatives for pain reduction. Several multi-center clinical trials studying the efficacy of RFA in the treatment of moderate to severe pain in patients with metastatic bone disease have shown significant decreases in patient reported pain after treatment. These studies are limited however to patients with one or two metastatic sites; pain from multiple tumors can be difficult to localize for directed therapy. More recently, cryoablation has also been explored as a potentially effective alternative as the area of destruction created by this technique can be monitored more effectively by CT than RFA, a potential advantage when treating tumors adjacent to critical structures.

== Prognosis ==
The outlook depends on the type of tumor. The outcome is expected to be good for people with noncancerous (benign) tumors, although some types of benign tumors may eventually become cancerous (malignant). With malignant bone tumors that have not spread, most patients achieve a cure, but the cure rate depends on the type of cancer, location, size, and other factors.

== Epidemiology ==
Bone tumors that originate from bone are very rare and account for around 0.2% of all tumors. Average five-year survival in the United States after being diagnosed with bone and joint cancer is 68% (2015–2021).

== History ==
The earliest known bone tumor was an osteosarcoma in a foot bone belonging to a person who died in Swartkrans Cave, South Africa, between 1.6 and 1.8 million years ago.

== Other animals ==
Bones are a common site for tumors in cats and dogs.
