= Alexion Pharmaceuticals =

American healthcare company

Alexion Pharmaceuticals, Inc.

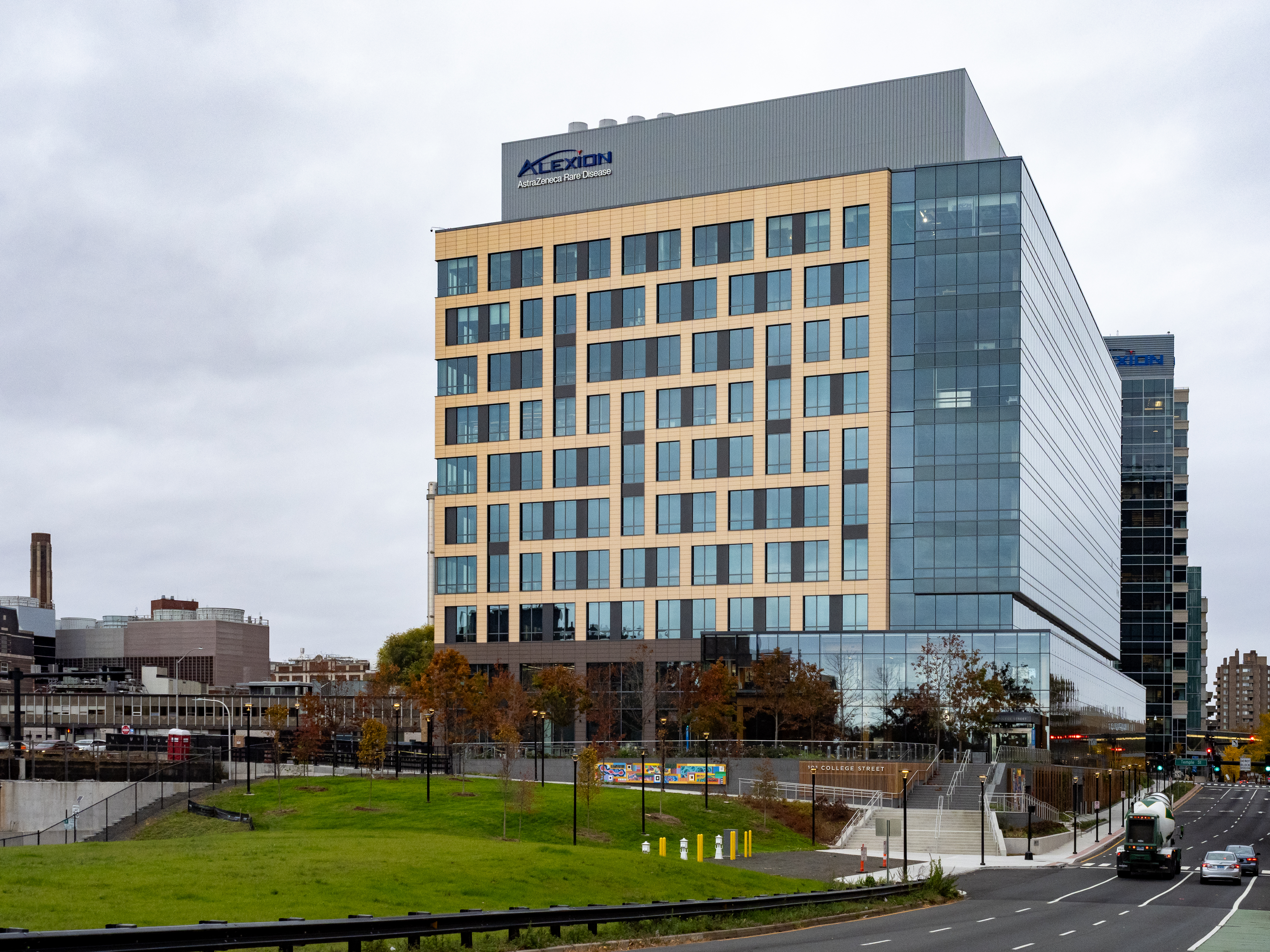
- Offices in New Haven, Connecticut
- Type: Subsidiary
- Traded as: Nasdaq: ALXN
- Industry: Pharmaceutical industry
- Founded: 1992; 34 years ago
- Founder: Leonard Bell
- Headquarters: Boston, Massachusetts, U.S.
- Key people: Leonard Bell (chairman); Ludwig N. Hantson (CEO)
- Products: Eculizumab (Soliris); Ravulizumab (Ultomiris); Asfotase alfa (Strensiq); Sebelipase alfa (Kanuma); Andexanet alfa (Andexxa)
- Revenue: ▲US$6.069 billion (2020)
- Net income: ▼US$603 million (2020)
- Total assets: ▲US$18.103 billion (2020)
- Total equity: ▲US$11.651 billion (2020)
- Number of employees: 2,525 (2020)
- Parent: AstraZeneca
- Website: www.alexion.com

Alexion Pharmaceuticals, Inc., a subsidiary of AstraZeneca, is a pharmaceutical company headquartered in New Haven, Connecticut, specializing in orphan drugs for rare diseases.

Its products include eculizumab (Soliris) and ravulizumab (Ultomiris), both used to treat the rare disorders of atypical hemolytic uremic syndrome (aHUS) and paroxysmal nocturnal hemoglobinuria (PNH); asfotase alfa (Strensiq), used to treat hypophosphatasia; sebelipase alfa (Kanuma), used to treat lysosomal acid lipase deficiency, and andexanet alfa (Andexxa), used to stop life threatening or uncontrollable bleeding in people who are taking rivaroxaban or apixaban.

With costs that can reach as much as $2 million per year, the drugs manufactured by Alexion are some of the most expensive drugs worldwide.

== History ==
Alexion Pharmaceuticals was founded in 1992 at Science Park in New Haven, Connecticut by Steven Squinto and Leonard Bell, a physician at Yale New Haven Hospital and assistant professor of medicine and pathology at Yale School of Medicine.

In 2000, Alexion moved its headquarters from New Haven to Cheshire, Connecticut.

Alexion received U.S. Food and Drug Administration (FDA) approval for Soliris in 2007. It was initially approved to treat paroxysmal nocturnal hemoglobinuria, a rare blood disorder.

In June 2010, there was an outbreak of hemolytic–uremic syndrome caused by shigatoxigenic and verotoxigenic Escherichia coli (EHEC) in Germany. Soliris was tested as a treatment option because of its effectiveness in treating atypical hemolytic uremic syndrome, an illness similar to that caused by the EHEC infection.

In January 2014, the company paid Moderna $100 million for ten product options to develop rare disease treatments, including for Crigler–Najjar syndrome, using Moderna's mRNA therapeutics platform; however, the program was scrapped in January 2017 after animal trials showed that Moderna's treatment would never be safe enough for humans.

In April 2015, Bell was replaced as CEO by David Hallal.

In October 2015, Alexion's second drug, Strensiq (asfotase alfa), was approved by the Food and Drug Administration. It is used to treat hypophosphatasia, a rare metabolic disorder.

In 2016, the company became a member of the Pharmaceutical Research and Manufacturers of America (PhRMA).

Alexion moved its headquarters back to New Haven following the completion of New Haven's Downtown Crossing project in February 2016.

In December 2016, David Brennan became interim CEO. David Anderson, formerly the CFO of Honeywell, was appointed CFO, replacing Vikas Sinha.

In March 2017, Alexion named Ludwig N. Hantson as its CEO.

In September 2017, Alexion announced it would cut its workforce by 20% and move its headquarters to Boston, Massachusetts in mid-2018. It also announced the closure of its manufacturing facility in Smithfield, Rhode Island.

In July 2020, the company agreed to pay more than $21 million to settle claims that it bribed government officials in Turkey and Russia to gain approval for its drugs.

In July 2021, AstraZeneca acquired the company for $39 billion. It was the third-largest deal made in 2020.

=== Acquisitions ===
In September 2000, Alexion acquired Proliferon, a development-stage biopharmaceutical firm, for $41 million in stock. The company was renamed Alexion Antibody Technologies.

Alexion acquired Montreal-based Enobia Pharma, the developer of asfotase alfa, a drug used to treat the genetic disorder hypophosphatasia, in December 2011 for approximately $1.08 billion.

In June 2015, Alexion acquired Synageva, a maker of rare disease treatments, in an $8.4 billion stock-and-cash deal.

In April 2018, Alexion announced the acquisition of Wilson Therapeutics for $855 million. In November of that year, the company acquired Syntimmune for $1.2 billion, expanding its rare disease offerings.

Achillion Pharmaceuticals was acquired in January 2020 for $930 million, boosting its immune system disease pipeline, and in July of that year, the company purchased Portola Pharmaceuticals, diversifying its hematology, neurology, and critical care commercial portfolio with Portola's Factor Xa inhibitor reversal agent.

Caelum Biosciences was acquired in October 2021 for a reported $500 million.

=== Acquisition history ===
The following is an illustration of the company's mergers, acquisitions, corporate spin-offs and historical predecessors:

- Alexion Pharmaceuticals
  - - - - - - - - - Alexion Pharmaceuticals
                    (Founded 1992)
              - - Proliferon Inc
                  (Acq 2000, restructured into Alexion Antibody Technologies Inc)
            - - Enobia Pharma Corp
                (Acq 2011)
          - - Synageva
              (Acq 2015)
        - - Wilson Therapeutics
            (Acq 2018)
      - - Syntimmune
          (Acq 2018)
    - - Achillion Pharmaceuticals
        (Acq 2019)
  - - Portola Pharmaceuticals
      (Acq 2020)
