= Bone disease =

- Specialty: Rheumatology

Bone disease refers to the medical conditions which affect the bone.

== Terminology ==
A bone disease is also called an "osteopathy", but because the term osteopathy is often used to refer to an alternative health-care philosophy, use of the term can cause some confusion.

== Bone and cartilage disorders ==
Osteochondrodysplasia is a general term for a disorder of the development of bone and cartilage.

== List ==
=== A ===
- Ambe
- Avascular necrosis or Osteonecrosis
- Arthritis

=== B ===
- Bone spur (Osteophytes)

=== C ===
- Craniosynostosis
- Coffin–Lowry syndrome
- Copenhagen disease

=== F ===
- Fibrodysplasia ossificans progressiva
- Fibrous dysplasia
- Fong disease (or Nail–patella syndrome)
- Fracture

=== G ===
- Giant cell tumor of bone
- Greenstick fracture
- Gout

=== H ===
- Hypophosphatasia
- Hereditary multiple exostoses

=== K ===
- Klippel–Feil syndrome

=== M ===
- Metabolic bone disease
- Multiple myeloma

=== N ===
- Nail–patella syndrome

=== O ===
- Osteitis
- Osteitis deformans (or Paget's disease of bone)
- Osteitis fibrosa cystica (or Osteitis fibrosa, or Von Recklinghausen's disease of bone)
- Osteitis pubis
- Condensing osteitis (or Osteitis condensas)
- Osteochondritis dissecans
- Osteochondroma (bone tumor)
- Osteogenesis imperfecta
- Osteomalacia
- Osteomyelitis
- Osteopenia
- Osteopetrosis
- Osteoporosis

=== P ===
- Porotic hyperostosis
- Primary hyperparathyroidism

=== R ===
- Renal osteodystrophy

=== S ===
- Salter–Harris fracture
- Scoliosis

=== W ===
- Water on the knee

== See also ==
- Osteoimmunology
