= Endocrine bone disease =

- Specialty: Endocrinology, rheumatology

An endocrine bone disease is a bone disease associated with a disorder of the endocrine system. An example is osteitis fibrosa cystica.

== Mechanism ==
The thyroid, parathyroid, pituitary, or adrenal glands, and the pancreas are parts of the endocrine system, and, therefore are associated with the endocrine bone disease. Some common endocrine disorders are hypothyroidism, hyperthyroidism, Paget's disease, Osteoporosis, and diabetes. The thyroid gland produces thyroxin (T3, and T4) which is necessary for normal development of the nervous system. Its functions include: promoting growth, increasing basal metabolic rate and controlling body temperature. Adequate iodine intake is necessary for the production of thyroid hormone. According to Payton R. G. et al., a common disorder of the thyroid gland is hypothyroidism, which is more prevalent in women than in men. Symptoms of hypothyroidism include cold intolerance, weight gain, fatigue, anemia, difficulty concentrating, amenorrhea, bradycardia (low heart rate) and goiter.

Another hormone that is secreted by Para follicular cells of the thyroid gland is calcitonin. Calcitonin works in an antagonistic fashion with parathyroid hormone (PTH): both regulate the level of calcium in the blood. Blood calcium level is tightly regulated by these two hormones. The cells of our bone that is involved in bone formation and bone breakdown is osteoblast and osteoclast respectively. Osteoclasts are cells of bones that promote bone demineralization or bone resorption. In contrast, Osteoblast promotes calcium absorption by the bone therefore, promoting bone mineralization and formation of new bones. Thus Calcitonin activates osteoblasts, therefore decrease blood calcium levels by decreasing bone breakdown (resorption) by inhibiting osteoclast. Whereas, PTH activates osteoclast and thereby increases blood calcium.

The hormone produced by the thyroid gland has big impact on bone density, blood calcium levee. Abnormalities of the thyroid gland impact bone disease such as osteoporosis, a condition that is common in women but men can be diagnosed with this silent disease as well as it mainly affects elderly individual.

== Vitamin D ==
In addition to the thyroid gland, Vitamin D plays a crucial role in the absorption of calcium. In fact, Vitamin D is needed for efficient absorption of calcium and therefore proper bone health. Vitamin D is a fat-soluble vitamin, as well, it is unique because it is considered as a hormone; synthesized endogenously in the liver in form of Cholecalciferol. The endogenous inactive form of Vitamin D is Cholecalciferol or Vitamin D3 which is converted to active form of Vitamin D–Calcitriol also known as 1, 25-Dihydroxycholecalciferol in the Kidney upon exposure to UV ray of sun light. Deficiency in Vitamin D or renal disease contributes to bone disorder such as in Osteomalacia in adult and Rickets in children. Osteomalacia is the softening of bones due to poor bone mineralization which is in turn due to poor calcium absorption. Ultimately, these hormonal changes in body; such as function of thyroid, parathyroid, liver and kidney disrupts metabolic changes as well as function of specific organs, which in turn leads to condition that are not desirable such as bone disorders or other endocrine related diseases.

== Diagnosis ==
Bone disease is common among the elderly individual, but adolescents can be diagnosed with this disorder as well. There are many bone disorders such as osteoporosis, Paget's disease, hypothyroidism. Although there are many forms of bone disorders, they all have one thing in common; abnormalities of specific organs involved, deficiency in vitamin D or low Calcium in diet, which results in poor bone mineralization.

== Epidemiology ==
Endocrine disorder is more common in women than men, as it is associated with menstrual disorders.

== See also ==
- Fibrous dysplasia of bone
