= Metabolic bone disease =

- Other names: Metabolic bone disorder, MBD
- Specialty: Endocrinology, rheumatology, orthopedic surgery, neonatology, veterinary medicine
- Symptoms: Often none until fracture or demineralization is advanced; bone pain, deformity
- Complications: Fractures, skeletal deformity, impaired growth in children
- Types: Osteoporosis, osteomalacia, rickets, Paget's disease of bone, osteitis fibrosa cystica, chronic kidney disease–mineral and bone disorder, hereditary disorders
- Causes: Mineral and vitamin D deficiency, hyperparathyroidism, chronic kidney disease, genetic variants, preterm birth
- Diagnostic method: Blood tests, radiography, bone mineral density testing, bone biopsy
- Differential diagnosis: Child abuse (in infants with unexplained fractures), bone tumors
- Prevention: Adequate calcium, phosphate, and vitamin D; weight-bearing exercise
- Treatment: Treating the underlying cause, mineral and vitamin D replacement

Metabolic bone disease (MBD) is an umbrella term for a clinically heterogeneous group of disorders whose common feature is an abnormal chemical environment in bone, which leads to a defective skeleton. The underlying causes range from nutritional deficiencies to pathogenic variants in genes governing development of the human skeleton. Disturbances of calcium, phosphate, magnesium, or vitamin D are common causes, and the resulting bone changes can often be reversed once the underlying defect is corrected.

MBD is distinguished from skeletal dysplasias, a larger group of heritable disorders with generalized abnormalities of cartilage and bone, although the two groups overlap. Patients are usually managed by endocrinologists and, less often, orthopedic surgeons.

The term is also used in veterinary medicine, where metabolic bone disease is common in captive reptiles and is typically caused by dietary calcium deficiency.

== Classification ==
Conditions commonly considered metabolic bone diseases include:

- Osteoporosis and osteopenia
- Osteomalacia (adults) and rickets (children)
- Hyperparathyroid bone disease, including osteitis fibrosa cystica
- Paget's disease of bone
- Chronic kidney disease–mineral and bone disorder (CKD-MBD)
- Hereditary disorders such as osteogenesis imperfecta, hypophosphatasia, X-linked hypophosphatemic rickets, and osteopetrosis
- Metabolic bone disease of prematurity

Hereditary metabolic bone diseases have been grouped into sclerosing bone disorders, disorders of defective bone mineralization, and disorders of bone matrix and cartilage formation.

== Pathophysiology ==
In healthy adults, bone is continually replaced through bone remodeling, a coupled process in which osteoclasts resorb old bone and osteoblasts form new bone. Osteoblast-lineage cells regulate osteoclasts through RANKL and osteoprotegerin. Metabolic bone diseases such as hyperparathyroidism and Paget's disease can arise when this coupling is imbalanced, and failure to mineralize newly formed osteoid produces rickets in the immature skeleton and osteomalacia in the mature one. Failure of organs that are central to calcium homeostasis, as in chronic kidney failure, can also produce bone disease.

== Causes ==
Osteomalacia results from inadequate mineralization of bone tissue caused by deficiency of vitamin D, calcium, or phosphate. Liver disease can contribute by impairing production of calcidiol.

Sustained overproduction of parathyroid hormone (PTH) in primary, secondary, or tertiary hyperparathyroidism can cause osteitis fibrosa cystica, which is a frequent manifestation of end-stage kidney disease. Chronic kidney disease–mineral and bone disorder spans osteomalacia, adynamic bone disease, osteitis fibrosa cystica, and mixed bone disease.

Secondary causes of bone loss include other medical conditions and certain medications. They are reported to affect about two-thirds of older men, over half of premenopausal women, and about 30% of postmenopausal women with osteoporosis.

Hereditary forms arise from variants in genes that control skeletal homeostasis. One review examined 25 hereditary metabolic bone diseases and variants in 78 genes.

== Diagnosis and treatment ==
Many metabolic bone diseases are silent until bone mass is substantially reduced. More than three-quarters of people with Paget's disease of bone have no symptoms, and osteopenia of prematurity can remain clinically silent or present with signs of rickets. Rickets causes bowing and short stature in children. Advanced osteitis fibrosa cystica can cause bone pain, swelling, deformity, and fractures.

=== Diagnosis ===
Diagnosis combines clinical assessment, blood tests, and imaging, and the work-up depends on the suspected cause. Osteomalacia is evaluated with serum vitamin D levels, PTH measurement, and bone mineral density scans. In hyperparathyroid bone disease, typical laboratory findings are high calcium, raised or inappropriately normal PTH, low phosphate, and raised alkaline phosphatase. Radiographic features include a "salt-and-pepper" appearance of the skull and subperiosteal bone resorption in the fingers. Paget's disease is evaluated with bone X-rays, bone scans, and markers of bone breakdown such as N-telopeptide.

Bone biopsy, usually from the iliac crest, is rarely needed. When it is performed, undecalcified sections are required to judge mineralization, and wide osteoid seams are the diagnostic histologic feature of rickets and osteomalacia.

=== Prevention and treatment ===
Treatment targets the underlying cause. Nutritional forms are treated with vitamin D, calcium, and dietary adjustment. Weight-bearing exercise, smoking cessation, and adequate calcium and vitamin D intake help prevent bone loss, and early recognition of reversible secondary causes improves outcomes. Osteitis fibrosa cystica is treated by controlling the underlying hyperparathyroidism, most often with parathyroidectomy.

== Specific conditions ==
=== Osteitis fibrosa cystica ===
Osteitis fibrosa cystica is a late skeletal complication of sustained PTH excess. Once common, it now occurs in about 5% of US patients with primary hyperparathyroidism and about 1.5% of those with secondary disease, because hyperparathyroidism is detected earlier through routine serum calcium testing. It remains more prevalent in developing countries with limited access to screening. Its characteristic lesion is the "brown tumor", which is not a true neoplasm.

=== Rickets ===
Rickets is classified as calcipenic (calcium deficiency leading to secondary hyperparathyroidism) or phosphopenic (primary phosphate deficiency with normal calcium), and hypophosphatemia is common to both. Causes include dietary deficiency, liver and kidney disease, prematurity, and hereditary disorders of vitamin D or phosphate handling.

=== Paget's disease of bone ===
Paget's disease is the second most commonly diagnosed metabolic bone disease after osteoporosis. It usually begins in the fourth or fifth decade, and diagnosis is often delayed by about a decade. Some patients, including those without symptoms or abnormal blood tests, may not need treatment.

=== Osteogenesis imperfecta ===
Osteogenesis imperfecta, a hereditary disorder of type I collagen, has an estimated incidence of about 1 in 10,000 to 20,000 births. Variants in COL1A1 and COL1A2 account for more than 90% of cases.

=== Metabolic bone disease of prematurity ===
Metabolic bone disease of prematurity, also called osteopenia of prematurity or neonatal rickets, is a reduction in bone mineral content in preterm infants. Most bone mineralization occurs in the third trimester, so infants born early are deprived of the normal intrauterine mineral supply. Prevalence is inversely related to birth weight and gestational age, and reported rates vary by study and feeding method. Other risk factors include long-term parenteral nutrition, immobilization, and drugs such as diuretics and corticosteroids. The condition typically appears between the tenth and sixteenth week of life and is suggested by low serum phosphorus with raised alkaline phosphatase. Prevention relies on early nutritional intervention to supply adequate calcium, phosphorus, and vitamin D, with regular biochemical monitoring and early phosphate supplementation. The prognosis is generally good with appropriate supplementation.
