= Synageva =

Biopharmaceutical company

Synageva BioPharma Corp.
- Company type: Public
- Traded as: Nasdaq: GEVA
- Industry: Biopharmaceutical
- Founded: 1996; 29 years ago
- Headquarters: Lexington, Massachusetts, United States
- Website: www.synageva.com

Synageva BioPharma Corp. was a publicly listed biopharmaceutical company headquartered in Lexington, Massachusetts dedicated to discovering, developing and delivering medicines for patients with rare diseases and high unmet medical needs. The company had manufacturing and laboratory locations in Lexington and Holden, Massachusetts, Bogart and Athens Georgia, as well as offices in a variety of locations around the world.

== History ==
Synageva was formed when Sanj K. Patel (formerly an executive at Genzyme Corporation, Cambridge, Massachusetts) was approached in early 2008 by Baker Bros. Investments to be the CEO of privately held Avigenics, Inc. in Athens, Georgia, a company initially formed by Dr. Robert Ivarie of the University of Georgia. Upon joining AviGenics in June 2008, Mr. Patel created the vision and strategy for Synageva and changed the company's direction to focus on products for the treatment of devastating, rare diseases. This represented a substantial shift in the original company's business strategy of developing bio-similar drugs using its novel egg white (EW) protein production technology. The company's proprietary technology produces proteins by recombinant DNA technology in egg white (EW) using a transgenic Gallus expression system. The proteins are then purified using conventional recombinant protein chromatographic methods. The EW system can consistently express proteins that contain glycan structures, predominantly GlcNAc- and mannose-terminated N-linked glycan structures, as well as mannose-6-phosphate (M6P) glycans, which are specifically recognized and internalized via receptors into key target cells.

With the support from a dedicated and experienced team, Synageva went public on the NASDAQ Global Market in November 2011 by completing a reverse merger with Trimeris, Inc. Synageva later relocated its corporate headquarters to Lexington, Massachusetts.

On May 6, 2015, Alexion Pharmaceuticals (Nasdaq: ALXN) and Synageva announced that they entered into a definitive agreement in which Alexion would acquire Synageva for a value of $230 per share. The transaction was unanimously approved by both companies’ Boards of Directors and is valued at approximately $8.4 billion net of Synageva's cash (total $9.1 billion). This was one of the largest premiums paid to any company over $5 billion in market cap since 1995.

== Products ==
In July 2008, Mr. Patel designed and initiated Synageva's lead program, Kanuma® (sebelipase alfa) to address a rare and devastating disease known as lysosomal acid lipase deficiency (LAL Deficiency). Kanuma is a recombinant form of the natural human LAL enzyme and an enzyme replacement therapy being developed for patients with LAL Deficiency. LAL Deficiency is a serious, life-threatening disease associated with early mortality and significant morbidity. LAL Deficiency is a chronic disease in which genetic mutations result in decreased activity of the LAL enzyme; this leads to marked accumulation of lipids in vital organs, blood vessels, and other tissues, resulting in progressive and multi-systemic organ damage including fibrosis, cirrhosis, liver failure, accelerated atherosclerosis, cardiovascular disease, and other devastating consequences. LAL Deficiency affects patients of all ages with sudden and unpredictable clinical complications manifesting from infancy through adulthood. The disease can be diagnosed with a simple blood test.

Kanuma was granted orphan designation by the U.S. Food and Drug Administration (FDA), the European Medicines Agency (EMA), and the Japanese Ministry of Health, Labour and Welfare. Kanuma also received fast track designation by the FDA, and Breakthrough Therapy designation by the FDA for LAL Deficiency presenting in infants. The FDA accepted for review the Biologics License Application (BLA) for Kanuma, granted Synageva's request for Priority Review, and established a target action date of September 8, 2015 under the Prescription Drug User Fee Act (PDUFA). The EMA validated the Marketing Authorization Application (MAA) for Kanuma and granted the company's request for accelerated assessment.

Synageva's other pipeline programs consisted of protein therapeutic programs for rare diseases with unmet medical need at various stages of development, including a Phase 1/2 trial with its second, first-mover program, SBC-103 for MPS IIIB. The company's third, first-mover program, SBC-105, was an enzyme replacement therapy in preclinical development for disorders of calcification. In addition to these first-mover programs, Synageva's pipeline also consisted of opportunities that leveraged the company's EW manufacturing platform and other capabilities to create potentially bio-superior treatments for patient populations where there is still unmet medical need. The company was able to produce enzymes targeting Hunter syndrome, Fabry disease and Pompe disease with expression levels and activity that supported further preclinical development.
