= Bone decalcification =

Bone decalcification is the softening of bones due to the removal of calcium ions, and can be performed as a histological technique to study bones and extract DNA. This process also occurs naturally during bone development and growth, and when uninhibited, can cause diseases such as osteomalacia.

== Histology ==
Since calcium-rich bones are exceedingly difficult to study, scientists use bone decalcification to make specimens available for their research. For example, bone decalcification has been used to examine cartilage and magnesium levels in order to understand bone decay.

There are two categories of decalcifying agents for removing calcium ions: chelating agents and acids. The acids are further divided into weak (picric, acetic and formic acid) and strong acids (nitric and hydrochloric acid). The acids help produce a solution of calcium ions while the chelating agents take up the calcium ions. The most frequently used chelating agent is ethylenediaminetetraacetic acid (EDTA).

Decalcification is a lengthy procedure, as bone pieces have to be left in the decalcifying agent for days to weeks, depending on the size of the bone. There are numerous methods to test when bone decalcification is complete, such as X-ray examination, chemical analysis, and measurement of specimen flexibility.

== Necessity ==
Decalcification is necessary to obtain soft sections of the bone using a microtome. Every thin section of the bone that is cut can be processed (see tissue processing) like any other soft tissue of the body.

== See also ==
- Bone seeker
- Bone biopsy
