= Asfotase alfa =

Pharmaceutical drug

Clinical data
- Trade names: Strensiq
- Other names: ALXN-1215
- AHFS/Drugs.com: Monograph
- License data: US DailyMed: Asfotase_alfa
- Pregnancy category: AU: C
- Routes of administration: Subcutaneous injection
- ATC code: A16AB13 (WHO)

Legal status
- Legal status: AU: S4 (Prescription only); CA: ℞-only; UK: POM (Prescription only); US: ℞-only; EU: Rx-only; In general: ℞ (Prescription only)

Pharmacokinetic data
- Bioavailability: 46–98%
- Elimination half-life: ~5 days

Identifiers
- CAS Number: 1174277-80-5
- DrugBank: DB09105
- ChemSpider: None
- UNII: Z633861EIM
- KEGG: D10595
- ChEMBL: ChEMBL2108311

Chemical and physical data
- Formula: C_{7108}H_{11008}N_{1968}O_{2206}S_{56}
- Molar mass: 161125.18 g·mol^{−1}

Asfotase alfa, sold under the brand name Strensiq, is a medication used in the treatment of people with perinatal/infantile- and juvenile-onset hypophosphatasia.

The most common side effects include injection site reactions, hypersensitivity reactions (such as difficulty breathing, nausea, dizziness and fever), lipodystrophy (a loss of fat tissue resulting in an indentation in the skin or a thickening of fat tissue resulting in a lump under the skin) at the injection site, and ectopic calcifications of the eyes and kidney.

The enzyme tissue non-specific alkaline phosphatase (ALP) plays a key role in creating and maintaining healthy bones, and managing calcium and phosphate in the body. People with hypophosphatasia cannot make enough working ALP, which leads to weak bones. Asfotase alfa is a version of the human ALP enzyme and serves as a replacement, thereby increasing levels of working ALP.

== Medical uses ==
In the United States, asfotase alfa is indicated for the treatment of people with perinatal/infantile- and juvenile-onset hypophosphatasia (HPP).

In the European Union, asfotase alfa is indicated for long-term enzyme replacement therapy in people with paediatric-onset hypophosphatasia to treat the bone manifestations of the disease.

== Adverse effects ==
The most common adverse effects in studies included injection site reactions (pain, itching, erythema, etc.), headache, limb pain, and haematoma. Possible rare side effects could not be assessed because of the low number of patients.

== Interactions ==
Asfotase alfa interferes with alkaline phosphatase measurements. As asfotase alfa is a glycoprotein (as opposed to a small molecule), no relevant interactions via the cytochrome P450 liver enzymes are expected.

== Pharmacology ==
=== Mechanism of action ===
Hypophosphatasia is caused by a genetic defect of tissue-nonspecific alkaline phosphatase (TNSALP), an enzyme that plays a role in bone mineralization. Asfotase alfa is a recombinant glycoprotein that contains the catalytic domain (the active site) of TNSALP. It is thus a form of enzyme replacement therapy.

=== Pharmacokinetics ===
After subcutaneous injection, asfotase alfa has a bioavailability of 46–98% and reaches highest blood plasma concentrations after 24 to 48 hours. Elimination half life is five days.

== Chemistry ==
The peptide part of the glycoprotein asfotase alfa consists of two identical chains of 726 amino acids each, containing (1) the catalytic domain of TNSALP, (2) the Fc region of human immunoglobulin G1, and (3) a sequence of ten L-aspartate residues at the carboxy terminus. The two chains are linked by two disulfide bridges. Each chain also contains four internal disulfide bridges.

The complete peptide sequence of one chain is

LVPEKEKDPK YWRDQAQETL KYALELQKLN TNVAKNVIMF LGDGMGVSTV TAARILKGQL
HHNPGEETRL EMDKFPFVAL SKTYNTNAQV PDSAGTATAY LCGVKANEGT VGVSAATERS
RCNTTQGNEV TSILRWAKDA GKSVGIVTTT RVNHATPSAA YAHSADRDWY SDNEMPPEAL
SQGCKDIAYQ LMHNIRDIDV IMGGGRKYMY PKNKTDVEYE SDEKARGTRL DGLDLVDTWK
SFKPRYKHSH FIWNRTELLT LDPHNVDYLL GLFEPGDMQY ELNRNNVTDP SLSEMVVVAI
QILRKNPKGF FLLVEGGRID HGHHEGKAKQ ALHEAVEMDR AIGQAGSLTS SEDTLTVVTA
DHSHVFTFGG YTPRGNSIFG LAPMLSDTDK KPFTAILYGN GPGYKVVGGE RENVSMVDYA
HNNYQAQSAV PLRHETHGGE DVAVFSKGPM AHLLHGVHEQ NYVPHVMAYA ACIGANLGHC
APASSLKDKT HTCPPCPAPE LLGGPSVFLF PPKPKDTLMI SRTPEVTCVV VDVSHEDPEV
KFNWYVDGVE VHNAKTKPRE EQYNSTYRVV SVLTVLHQDW LNGKEYKCKV SNKALPAPIE
KTISKAKGQP REPQVYTLPP SREEMTKNQV SLTCLVKGFY PSDIAVEWES NGQPENNYKT
TPPVLDSDGS FFLYSKLTVD KSRWQQGNVF SCSVMHEALH NHYTQKSLSL SPGKDIDDDD
DDDDDD 

Asfotase alfa is produced in Chinese hamster ovary cells.

== History ==
Asfotase alfa was granted orphan drug designation by the U.S. Food and Drug Administration (FDA) in September 2008.

Asfotase alfa is manufactured by Alexion Pharmaceuticals and it was granted breakthrough therapy designation by the U.S. FDA in 2015 as it is the first and only treatment for perinatal, infantile and juvenile-onset HPP. It was approved in October 2015, in the U.S. and in August 2015, in the EU.

The safety and efficacy of asfotase alfa were established in 99 participants with perinatal (disease occurs in utero and is evident at birth), infantile- or juvenile-onset HPP who received treatment for up to 6.5 years during four prospective, open-label studies. Study results showed that participants with perinatal- and infantile-onset HPP treated with asfotase alfa had improved overall survival and survival without the need for a ventilator (ventilator-free survival). Ninety-seven percent of treated participants were alive at one year of age compared to 42 percent of control participants selected from a natural history study group. Similarly, the ventilator-free survival rate at one year of age was 85 percent for treated participants compared to less than 50 percent for the natural history control participants.

Participants with juvenile-onset HPP treated with asfotase alfa showed improvements in growth and bone health compared to control participants selected from a natural history database. All treated participants had improvement in low weight or short stature or maintained normal height and weight. In comparison, approximately 20 percent of control participants had growth delays over time, with shifts in height or weight from the normal range for children their age to heights and weights well below normal for age. Juvenile-onset participants also showed improvements in bone mineralization, as measured on a scale that evaluates the severity of rickets and other HPP-related skeletal abnormalities based on x-ray images. All treated participants demonstrated substantial healing of rickets on x-rays while some natural history control participants showed increasing signs of rickets over time.
