= Hypocementosis =

Dental condition

Hypocementosis is a reduction in the amount of cementum on a tooth root. It is a feature of conditions such as cleidocranial dysplasia and hypophosphatasia.
