= Hantson =

Hantson is a surname. Notable people with the surname include:

- Ludwig N. Hantson (born 1962), Belgian businessman
- Renaud Hantson (born 1963), French singer

== See also ==
- Hanson (surname)
