= Infectious bone disease =

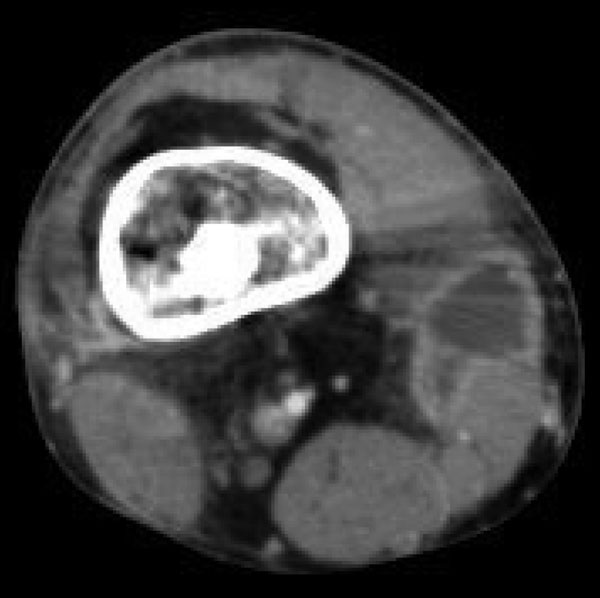
- Specialty: Rheumatology

An infectious bone disease is a bone disease primarily associated with an infection.

An example is osteomyelitis.
