= Che1 RNA motif =

Conserved RNA structure

che1
- Consensus secondary structure and sequence conservation of che1 RNA

Identifiers
- Symbol: che1
- Rfam: RF02935

Other data
- RNA type: Gene; sRNA
- SO: SO:0001263
- PDB structures: PDBe

The che1 RNA motif is a conserved RNA structure that was discovered by bioinformatics. che1 motifs are found in the genus Streptomyces, as well as some other organisms that are closely related to this genus.

It is ambiguous whether che1 RNAs function as cis-regulatory elements or whether they operate in trans. However, che1 RNAs are consistently located upstream of protein-coding genes, which are often predicted to function as cholesterol esterases. It is possible that che1 RNAs regulate these genes.
