= IPPK =

Protein-coding gene in humans

Identifiers
- Aliases: IPPK, C9orf12, INSP5K2, IP5K, IPK1, bA476B13.1, inositol-pentakisphosphate 2-kinase
- External IDs: MGI: 1922928; GeneCards: IPPK
Enzyme activity
EC #	BRENDA	ExPASy	KEGG	MetaCyc
2.7.1.158	↗	↗	↗	↗

Gene location (Human)
Chr.	Chromosome 9 (human)
Band	9q22.31	Start	92,613,183 bp
Band	9q22.31	End	92,670,131 bp

Gene location (Mouse)
Chr.	Chromosome 13 (mouse)
Band	13|13 A5	Start	49,574,725 bp
Band	13|13 A5	End	49,618,049 bp
RNA expression pattern
Bgee	Human / Mouse (ortholog); Top expressed in: skin of leg; skin of abdomen; skin of arm; tendon of biceps brachii; gingival epithelium; gonad; right hemisphere of cerebellum; skin of thigh; vagina; cervix epithelium / Top expressed in: primary oocyte; zygote; secondary oocyte; gastrula; decidua; mucous cell of stomach; cumulus cell; dentate gyrus of hippocampal formation granule cell; yolk sac; pyloric antrum; More reference expression data
BioGPS	n/a
Gene ontology
Molecular function	transferase activity; nucleotide binding; ATP binding; kinase activity; inositol pentakisphosphate 2-kinase activity; protein binding; molecular adaptor activity
Cellular component	cytoplasm; cytosol; intracellular anatomical structure; nucleoplasm; nucleus; nucleolus; RNA polymerase I complex
Biological process	inositol phosphate metabolic process; inositol phosphorylation; phosphorylation; inositol phosphate biosynthetic process; positive regulation of transcription of nucleolar large rRNA by RNA polymerase I
Sources:Amigo / QuickGO
Orthologs
Databases	NCBI: entry; OMA: entry
Species	Human	Mouse
Entrez	64768	75678
Ensembl	ENSG00000127080	ENSMUSG00000021385
UniProt	Q9H8X2	Q6P1C1
RefSeq (mRNA)	NM_022755	NM_001276399; NM_199056
RefSeq (protein)	NP_073592	NP_001263328; NP_951011
Location (UCSC)	Chr 9: 92.61 – 92.67 Mb	Chr 13: 49.57 – 49.62 Mb
PubMed search
- Wikidata
View/Edit Human	View/Edit Mouse

Inositol-pentakisphosphate 2-kinase (EC 2.7.1.158) is a protein that in humans is encoded by the IPPK gene. Inositol-pentakisphosphate 2-kinase is a small molecule kinase that catalyzes the phosphorylation of inositol-1,3,4,5,6-pentakisphosphate to form inositol-1,2,3,4,5,6-hexakisphosphate. Pathogenic variants in IPPK are associated with pentasomy-related intellectual disability syndrome, and with hypophosphatasia.
