= Sebelipase alfa =

Clinical data
- Trade names: Kanuma
- AHFS/Drugs.com: Monograph
- License data: US DailyMed: Sebelipase_alfa
- Pregnancy category: AU: B1
- Routes of administration: Intravenous infusion
- ATC code: A16AB14 (WHO)

Legal status
- Legal status: AU: S4 (Prescription only); CA: ℞-only; UK: POM (Prescription only); US: ℞-only; EU: Rx-only; In general: ℞ (Prescription only)

Pharmacokinetic data
- Elimination half-life: 0.1 hours

Identifiers
- CAS Number: 1276027-63-4
- DrugBank: DB11563
- ChemSpider: none
- UNII: K4YTU42T8G
- KEGG: D10377

Sebelipase alfa, sold under the brand name Kanuma, is a recombinant form of the enzyme lysosomal acid lipase (LAL) that is used as a medication for the treatment of lysosomal acid lipase deficiency (LAL-D). It is administered via intraveneous infusion. It was approved for medical use in the European Union and in the United States in 2015.

== Medical uses ==
Sebelipase alfa is indicated for long-term enzyme replacement therapy (ERT) in people of all ages with lysosomal acid lipase (LAL) deficiency.

== History ==
Sebelipase was developed by Synageva that became part of Alexion Pharmaceuticals in 2015. For its production, chickens are genetically modified to produce the recombinant form of LAL (rhLAL) in their egg white. After extraction and purification it becomes available as the medication. On 8 December 2015 the FDA announced that its approval came from two centers: The Center for Drug Evaluation and Research (CDER) approved the human therapeutic application of the medication, while the Center for Veterinary Medicine (CVM) approved the application for a recombinant DNA construct in genetically engineered chicken to produce rhLAL in their egg whites. At the time it gained FDA approval Kanuma was the first only drug manufactured in chicken eggs and intended for use in humans.

Sebelipase alfa is an orphan drug; its effectiveness was published after a phase 3 trial in 2015. The disease of LAL affects < 0.2 in 10,000 people in the EU.

== Society and culture ==
=== Economics ===
In 2018, the Canadian Agency for Drugs and Technologies in Health's cost review of sebelipase alfa for lysosomal acid lipase deficiency shows that the drug is supplied as a 20 mg/10 mL injectable solution priced at $8,546 per vial. In infants under six months, treatment begins at 1 mg/kg weekly with escalation up to 3 mg/kg weekly, yielding average daily costs of $2,447 to $13,625 and annual costs between $891,936 and $4,905,100. In children and adults, the recommended dose is 1 mg/kg every other week, with daily costs of $1,833 to $2,443 and yearly costs ranging from $668,877 to $891,836.
