= Panosteitis =

Bone condition in dogs

Panosteitis, sometimes shortened to pano among breeders, is an occasionally seen long bone condition in large breed dogs. Pan means "all" or "entire", oste refers to bone, and itis signifies inflammation. It manifests with sudden, unexplained pain and lameness that may shift from leg to leg, usually between 5 and 14 months of age, earning the nickname "growing pains". Signs such as fever, weight loss, anorexia, and lethargy can also be seen. The cause is unknown, but genetics, stress, infection, metabolism, or an autoimmune component may be factors. It has also been suggested that rapid growth and high-protein food are involved in the pathogenesis. Whole blood analysis may show an elevated white blood cell count; this finding lends support to the theory that panosteitis is due to an infection.

Panosteitis is characterized histologically by an increase in activity of osteoblasts and fibroblasts in the periosteum, endosteum and bone marrow, resulting in fibrosis and the formation of connective tissue in the medullary cavity of the affected bone. Pain may be caused by increased pressure in the medullary cavity and the stimulation of pain receptors in the periosteum.

The humerus is most commonly affected. Males are more commonly affected than females.

== Diagnosis ==
Diagnosis is often a diagnosis of exclusion, meaning that other possible causes of lameness have been ruled out, such as hypertrophic osteodystrophy and osteochondrosis dissecans. History, signalment, and clinical signs can help a veterinarian form a presumptive diagnosis. On physical exam, the dog may display signs of pain on palpation of the long bones of the limbs. X-rays may show an increased density in the medullary cavity of the affected bones, often near the nutrient foramen (where the blood vessels enter the bone).

Early radiographs can appear normal despite pain, as the bone changes may take 10–14 days to become visible. The radiographic changes can also remain after pain has subsided. Other conditions, including hip dysplasia, elbow dysplasia and immune-mediated joint disease, may cause similar signs; severe, unusual or persistent signs can warrant further diagnostic tests.

== Treatment ==
Treatment consists of alleviating the pain and inflammation so that the dog is comfortable. This is achieved with the use of analgesics and anti-inflammatory drugs, like carprofen. Steroids may be given in more severe cases to reduce inflammation. It is also recommended to limit physical activity during treatment to prevent exacerbating the condition with high impacts. Lameness usually goes away after days to weeks without additional treatment. Recurrences up to the age of two years may occur. Larger breeds, such as German Shepherd Dogs, Golden Retrievers, Basset Hounds, Dobermanns, Labrador Retrievers, and Rottweilers, are more prone to this problem. There has been one suspected case of panosteitis in a fast-growing six-month-old camel with a shifting leg lameness.

Panosteitis is also referred to as eosinophilic panosteitis, enostosis, endosteal proliferation of new bone, and eopan.

== See also ==
- Osteitis
