= Baxalta =

Subsidiary of Takada pharmaceuticals

- Type: Subsidiary
- Traded as: NYSE: BXLT
- Industry: Biotechnology
- Founded: 2015; 11 years ago (Spun off from Baxter International)
- Fate: Acquired by Shire
- Headquarters: United States
- Key people: Ludwig N. Hantson (president and CEO)
- Products: Hematology, Immunology, Pulmonology
- Number of employees: 16,000
- Parent: Takeda Pharmaceutical Company
- Website: www.baxalta.com

Baxalta (Bax from the name of its former parent company; alta a Latin adjective meaning 'high' or 'profound') is a biopharmaceutical company founded on July 1, 2015 after its parent company, Baxter International, spun off its biopharmaceutical division. The company began its operation with a revenue of $6 billion, and is now a subsidiary of Takeda Pharmaceutical Company.

== Company history ==
Baxalta inherited all of its parent company's on-the-market treatments, focused on hemophilia. The company aimed to launch 20 in-development projects by 2020, heaping $2.5 billion in annual sales. Before being spun off, Baxalta acquired SuppreMol (a German company) for US$225 million. Baxalta also acquired the blockbuster leukemia drug Oncaspar from Sigma-Tau Finanziaria S.p.A. for US$900 million.

In August 2015, Shire plc made an unsolicited $30.6 billion stock offer for the company, increasing the Baxalta share price over 16%. Baxalta investors would be set to receive 0.1687 of Shire's American Depositary Receipts for every share they hold, representing a premium of 36%, compared to the company's stock price on August 3. This deal would create the largest global biotech company focused solely on rare diseases.

In 2016, the company was acquired by Shire for $32 billion. Subsequently, Shire was acquired by Takeda Pharmaceutical Company for $62 billion in January 2019.
