= Osteitis =

Inflammation of bone

- Specialty: Rheumatology

Osteitis is inflammation of bone. More specifically, it can refer to one of the following conditions:

- Osteomyelitis, or infectious osteitis, mainly bacterial osteitis
- Alveolar osteitis or "dry socket"
- Condensing osteitis (or Osteitis condensans)
- Osteitis deformans (or Paget's disease of bone)
- Osteitis fibrosa cystica (or Osteitis fibrosa, or Von Recklinghausen's disease of bone)
- Osteitis pubis
- Radiation osteitis
  - Osteitis condensans ilii
- Panosteitis, a long bone condition in large breed dogs
- In horses, pedal osteitis is frequently confused with laminitis.

== See also ==
- Osteochondritis
- SAPHO syndrome
