= Brown tumor =

Massive bone lesion due to excess osteoclast activity

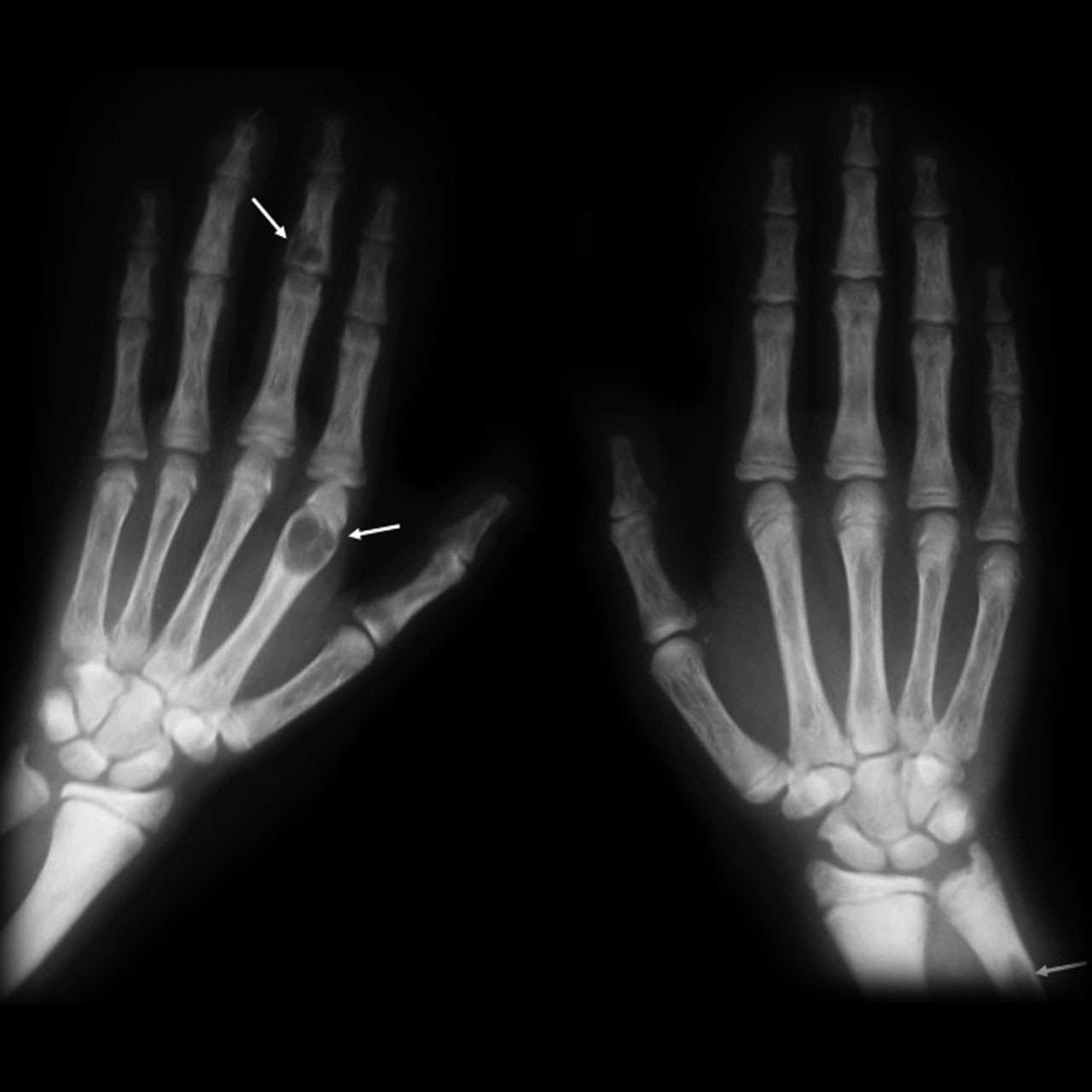
- Brown tumours of the hands in a patient with hyperparathyroidism.

The brown tumor is a bone lesion that arises in settings of excess osteoclast activity, such as hyperparathyroidism. They are a form of osteitis fibrosa cystica. It is not a neoplasm, but rather simply a mass. It most commonly affects the maxilla and mandible, though any bone may be affected. Brown tumours are radiolucent on x-ray.

== Pathology ==
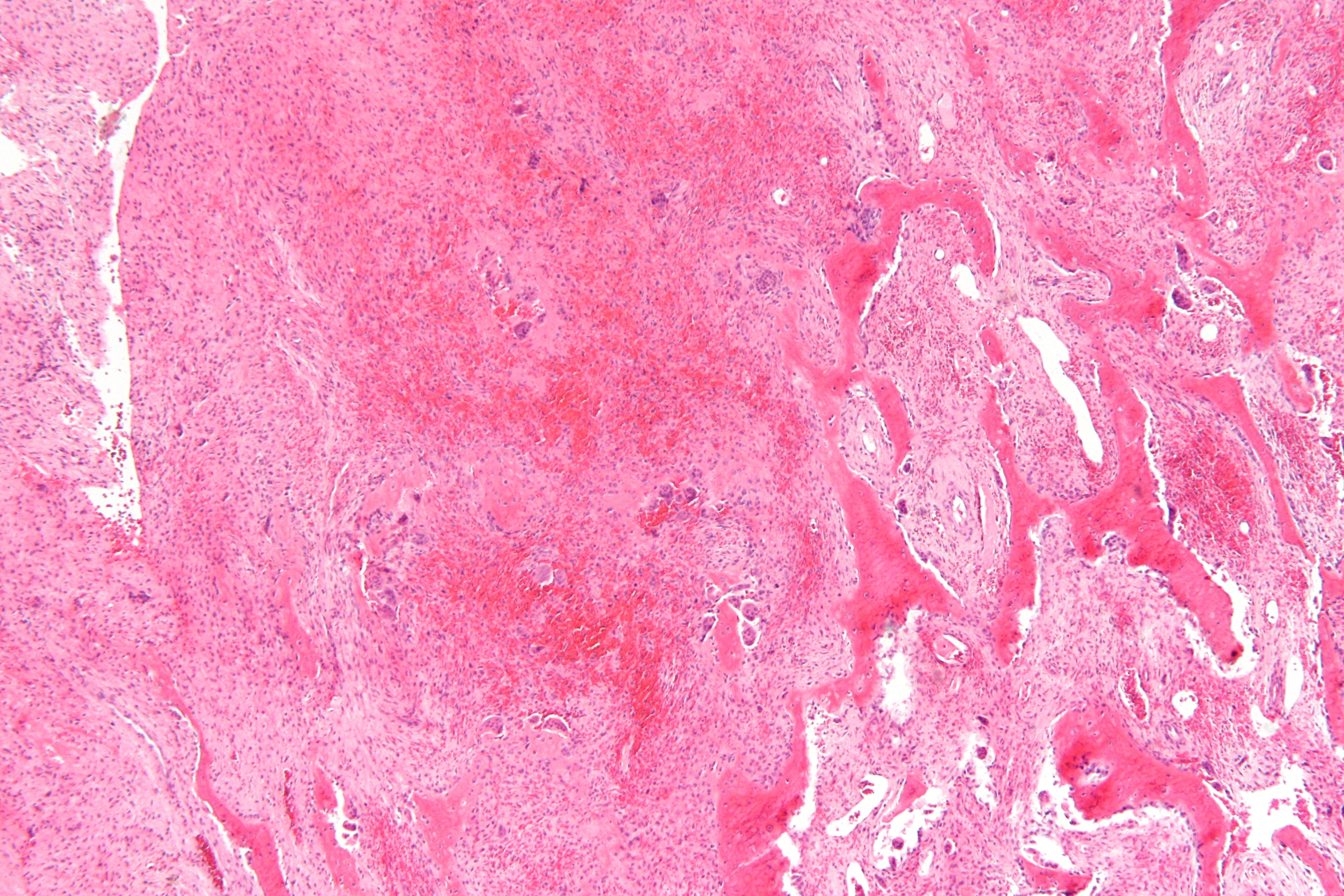
Micrograph of a brown tumor (left of image). H&E stain.

Brown tumours consist of fibrous tissue, woven bone and supporting vasculature, but no matrix. The osteoclasts consume the trabecular bone that osteoblasts lay down and this front of reparative bone deposition followed by additional resorption can expand beyond the usual shape of the bone, involving the periosteum thus causing bone pain. The characteristic brown coloration results from hemosiderin deposition into the osteolytic cysts. Hemosiderin deposition is not a distinctive feature of brown tumors; it may also be seen in giant cell tumors of the bone.

Brown tumors may be rarely associated with ectopic parathyroid adenomas or end stage renal osteodystrophy.

== Diagnosis ==
Histologically, it is impossible to distinguish a brown tumor of hyperparathyroidism from other giant cell lesions of bone. Rarely a focal collection of osteoclasts (brown tumor) may occur in relation to periosteum and be indistinguishable from a peripheral giant cell granuloma (giant cell epulis). The possibility of hyperparathyroidism should be considered in patients with recurrent or multiple giant cell epulides.

Radiographically, brown tumor may show no detectable changes or a generalized osteoporosis. Partial loss of lamina dura around the teeth may occur but is not a constant feature. Focal Lesions (Brown Tumor) present as sharply defined, round or oval radiolucent areas which may appear multilocular. Such lesions occur more frequently in mandible than maxilla

== Treatment ==
Treatment of hyperparathyroidism is required. Parathyroidectomy usually leads to spontaneous healing of Brown tumors in primary cases. Calcitriol (Rocaltrol) and cinacalcet (a calcimimetic) are used as pharmacologic treatments.

== Epidemiology ==
Age and gender have an effect on the incidence of these lesions; they are more prevalent in women than men (though still common in both genders), and they appear more frequently with age. Due to the standard of medical care and screening in developed countries, it is increasingly rare for primary hyperparathyroidism to present with accompanying bone disease. This is not the case in less developed nations, however, and the two conditions are more often seen together.

== See also ==
- Osteitis fibrosa cystica
