= ALPL =

Protein-coding gene in the humans

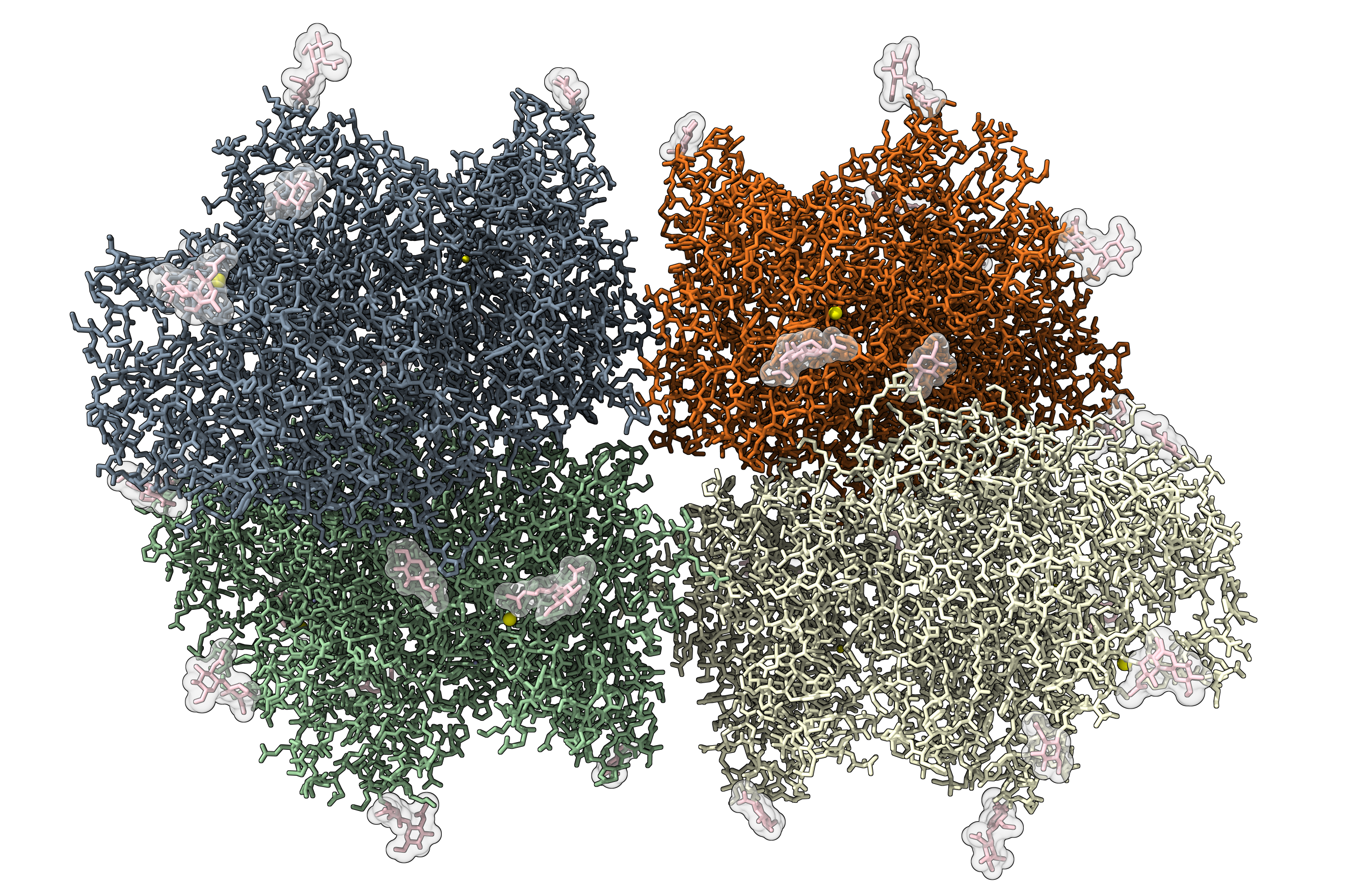

Identifiers
- Aliases: ALPL, AP-TNAP, APTNAP, HOPS, TNAP, TNSALP, alkaline phosphatase, liver/bone/kidney, TNALP, alkaline phosphatase, biomineralization associated, HPPA, HPPI, HPPC, HPPO, TNS-ALP
- External IDs: OMIM: 171760; MGI: 87983; GeneCards: ALPL
Enzyme activity
| EC # | BRENDA | ExPASy | KEGG | MetaCyc |
|---|---|---|---|---|
| 3.1.3.1 | ↗ | ↗ | ↗ | ↗ |
| 3.9.1.1 | ↗ | ↗ | ↗ | ↗ |

Gene location (Human)
| Chr. | Chromosome 1 (human) |
| Band | 1p36.12 | Start | 21,509,397 bp |
| Band | 1p36.12 | End | 21,578,410 bp |

Gene location (Mouse)
| Chr. | Chromosome 4 (mouse) |
| Band | 4 D3|4 70.02 cM | Start | 137,469,044 bp |
| Band | 4 D3|4 70.02 cM | End | 137,523,695 bp |
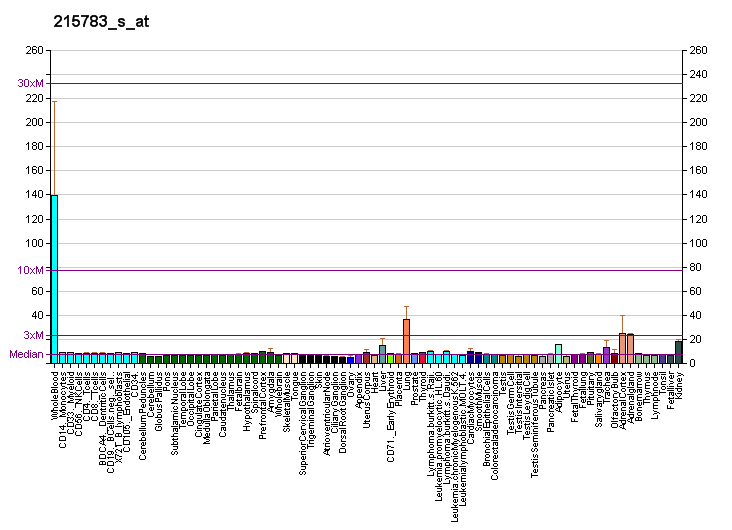
RNA expression pattern
| Bgee | Human / Mouse (ortholog); Top expressed in: right adrenal gland; right adrenal cortex; left adrenal cortex; right lobe of liver; upper lobe of lung; upper lobe of left lung; gonad; blood; right lung; lower lobe of lung / Top expressed in: molar; calvaria; body of femur; blastocyst; right kidney; neural layer of retina; human kidney; transitional epithelium of urinary bladder; facial skeleton; jaw; More reference expression data |
| BioGPS | More reference expression data |
Gene ontology
| Molecular function | protein binding; metal ion binding; hydrolase activity; alkaline phosphatase activity; catalytic activity; pyrophosphatase activity; phosphatase activity |
| Cellular component | integral component of membrane; anchored component of membrane; membrane; extracellular membrane-bounded organelle; extracellular exosome; extracellular region; extracellular space; plasma membrane; extracellular matrix |
| Biological process | response to lipopolysaccharide; osteoblast differentiation; biomineral tissue development; cementum mineralization; cellular response to organic cyclic compound; skeletal system development; metabolism; dephosphorylation; response to vitamin D; response to antibiotic; developmental process involved in reproduction; response to glucocorticoid; endochondral ossification; C-terminal protein lipidation |
Sources:Amigo / QuickGO
Orthologs
| Databases | NCBI: entry; OMA: entry |
| Species | Human | Mouse |
| Entrez | 249 | 11647 |
| Ensembl | ENSG00000162551 | ENSMUSG00000028766 |
| UniProt | P05186 | P09242 |
| RefSeq (mRNA) | NM_000478; NM_001127501; NM_001177520; NM_001369803; NM_001369804 NM_001369805 | NM_001287172; NM_001287176; NM_007431 |
| RefSeq (protein) | NP_000469; NP_001120973; NP_001170991; NP_001356732; NP_001356733 NP_001356734 | NP_001274101; NP_031457 |
| Location (UCSC) | Chr 1: 21.51 – 21.58 Mb | Chr 4: 137.47 – 137.52 Mb |
| PubMed search |
- Wikidata
| View/Edit Human | View/Edit Mouse |

Alkaline phosphatase, tissue-nonspecific isozyme (TNAP) is an enzyme that in humans is encoded by the ALPL gene. Its chemical formula is:C_{2916}H_{4587}O_{1110}N_{707}S_{19}P_{2}.

TNAP catalyses the breakdown of pyrophosphate (an extracellular inhibitor of hydroxyapatite precipitation). It is secreted into the osteoid by osteoblasts to allow bone mineralization to take place.

== Function ==
There are at least four distinct but related alkaline phosphatases: intestinal, placental, placental-like, and liver/bone/kidney (tissue-nonspecific). The first three are located together on chromosome 2, whereas the tissue-nonspecific form is located on chromosome 1. The product of this gene is a membrane-bound glycosylated enzyme that is expressed in a variety of tissues and is, therefore, referred to as the tissue-nonspecific form of the enzyme. A proposed function of this form of the enzyme is in regulating matrix mineralization through its ability to degrade mineralization-inhibiting pyrophosphate. Mice that lack a functional form of this enzyme (gene knockout mice) show abnormal skeletal and dental development including a mineralization deficiency called osteomalacia/odontomalacia (hypomineralization of bones and teeth). Humans with inactivating mutations in the ALPL gene likewise have variable degrees of mineralization defects depending on the location of the mutation in the ALPL gene.

== Structure ==
Tissue Non-Specific Alkaline Phosphatase (TNAP), encoded by the ALPL gene, exhibits an intriguing octameric structure as revealed by X-ray crystallography. This distinct arrangement consists of four individual dimeric TNAP units. Structural studies on homologs of TNAP, namely human (ALPP) and Escherichia coli (ecPhoA), have identified the dimer as the minimal stable unit of TNAP. Notably, a single TNAP protein contains four metal ion binding sites: two Zn^{2+} sites and one Mg^{2+} site situated in the reaction center, and one Ca2+ site within the regulatory pocket. The octameric state observed in TNAP is unique compared to previously characterized alkaline phosphatases, all of which have been found in a dimeric state.

== Tissue expression and isoforms ==
As the isozyme name "tissue-nonspecific" implies, TNAP is expressed ubiquitously and modified by post-translational glycosylation processes, to become isoforms that provide significant proteomic diversity and specificity relating to various tissues and cells. The highest levels of human TNAP isoforms are expressed in bone, liver, and kidney tissues, with neutrophil granulocytes, brain and vascular cells as secondary sources of TNAP activity.

In human serum, the bone ALP (BALP) and liver ALP isoforms are the most abundant TNAP isoforms, in approximately a 1:1 ratio, comprising more than 90% of the total ALP activity. The remaining circulating ALP activity, 1–10%, is attributed mostly to intestinal ALP (IALP).

Several different analytical methods for separation and quantification of serum ALP isozymes and TNAP isoforms have been described over the years. Separation techniques like electrophoresis and chromatography are valuable for studying enzymes and proteins, revealing insights into their structure and function in pharmaceutical research and post-translational modifications (PTM) studies. In particular, the development of commercial immunoassays for serum ALP has improved the usefulness and availability for clinical routine and research.

== Clinical significance ==
This enzyme has been linked directly to a disorder known as hypophosphatasia, a disorder that is characterized by low serum ALP and undermineralised bone (osteomalacia). The character of this disorder can vary, however, depending on the specific mutation, since this determines age of onset and severity of symptoms.

The severity of symptoms ranges from premature loss of deciduous teeth with no bone abnormalities to stillbirth depending upon which amino acid is changed in the ALPL gene. Mutations in the ALPL gene lead to varying low activity of the enzyme tissue-nonspecific alkaline phosphatase (TNSALP or TNAP) resulting in hypophosphatasia (HPP). There are different clinical forms of HPP which can be inherited by an autosomal recessive trait or autosomal dominant trait, the former causing more severe forms of the disease. Alkaline phosphatase allows for mineralization of calcium and phosphorus by bones and teeth. ALPL gene mutation leads to insufficient TNAP enzyme and allows for an accumulation of chemicals such as inorganic pyrophosphate to indirectly cause elevated calcium levels in the body and lack of bone calcification.

The mutation E174K, where a glycine is converted to an alanine amino acid at the 571st position of its respective polypeptide chain, is a result of an ancestral mutation that occurred in Caucasians and shows a mild form of HPP.
