= Bone biopsy =

Medical test involving removal of sample from bone

A bone biopsy is a procedure in which a small bone sample is removed from the outer layers of bone for examination, unlike a bone marrow biopsy, which involves the innermost part of the bone. The bone biopsy sample retains the architecture of bone when seen using histopathological examination slide.

== Technique ==
The technique of bone biopsy allows the histomorphometric analysis of the bone samples obtained from the iliac crest. Therefore, it can provide a direct assessment of regional bone metabolism. Hence, the reason why this method is considered the gold-standard technique for measuring bone remodelling. Patients undergo double tetracycline labelling, and then samples of bone are collected using trephine under local anesthetic from the iliac crest as it is the only readily accessible site for bone biopsy. This technique is subject to large measurement errors; it is complex and costly to perform and is invasive, meaning that it is painful to the patients. For these reasons, a bone biopsy is not readily acceptable to patients. Moreover, multiple biopsies using double tetracycline labelling are necessary for the same patient to assess treatment response or disease progression. Another drawback is that the iliac crest may not provide a true measurement of changes in bone metabolism at the lumbar spine or hip as considerable differences in regional bone metabolism estimates are observed at different skeletal sites. Revell et al. describes the measurement of various parameters such as trabecular bone volume, osteoid volume, osteoid surface, active osteoblastic surface, resorption surface, osteoclastic resorption surface, mineralization front, osteoid index, appositional rate, and osteoclastic index via histomorphometric analysis of bone samples.

If a biopsy is to be obtained along with medical imaging examinations, as a rule, biopsy should be done after all necessary imaging has been performed. A bone biopsy can also be used to find out if cancer, or infection, or other abnormal cells are present in the bone tissue.
