= Sterol esterase =

sterol esterase

Identifiers
- EC no.: 3.1.1.13
- CAS no.: 9026-00-0

Databases
- BRENDA: enzyme data
- ExPASy: NiceZyme view
- KEGG: enzyme entry
- MetaCyc: metabolic pathway
- Rhea: reactions
- PDB structures: RCSB PDB PDBe PDBsum
- Gene Ontology: AmiGO / QuickGO
Search
- PMC: articles
- PubMed: articles
- NCBI: proteins

Sterol esterases (EC 3.1.1.13) (also called cholesterol esterases) are enzymes that act to remove fatty acids attached to cholesterol (or more general sterols). In particular, they catalyzes the reaction

a sterol ester + H_{2}O $\rightleftharpoons$ a sterol + a fatty acid

A common example of a sterol ester would be a cholesterol ester, which is essentially a cholesterol molecule with a fatty acid attached. This enzyme belongs to the family of hydrolases, specifically those acting on carboxylic ester bonds. In humans, the main proteins known to perform this function are the pancreatic digestive enzyme carboxyl ester lipase, the lysosome enzyme Lipase A, the liver detoxification enzyme carboxylesterase 1, and the skin enzyme Lipase member N. However, the activity of these enzymes is not limited to acting on sterol esters, and for example most can also act as true lipases (EC 3.1.1.3) and break down fats (triglycerides).

The systematic name is steryl-ester acylhydrolase. Other names in common use include cholesterol esterase, cholesteryl ester synthase, triterpenol esterase, cholesteryl esterase, cholesteryl ester hydrolase, sterol ester hydrolase, cholesterol ester hydrolase, cholesterase, and acylcholesterol lipase. This enzyme participates in bile acid biosynthesis.
