= Lysosomal lipase =

Protein found in humans

LIPA

Identifiers
- Aliases: LIPA, CESD, LAL, lipase A, lysosomal acid type
- External IDs: OMIM: 613497; MGI: 96789; GeneCards: LIPA
Enzyme activity
EC #	BRENDA	ExPASy	KEGG	MetaCyc
3.1.1.13	↗	↗	↗	↗

Gene location (Human)
Chr.	Chromosome 10 (human)
Band	10q23.31	Start	89,213,569 bp
Band	10q23.31	End	89,414,557 bp

Gene location (Mouse)
Chr.	Chromosome 19 (mouse)
Band	19|19 C1	Start	34,469,718 bp
Band	19|19 C1	End	34,504,874 bp
RNA expression pattern
Bgee	Human / Mouse (ortholog); Top expressed in: jejunal mucosa; duodenum; corpus callosum; visceral pleura; C1 segment; monocyte; inferior ganglion of vagus nerve; spleen; trabecular bone; lymph node / Top expressed in: left lobe of liver; stroma of bone marrow; right kidney; human kidney; calvaria; thymus; ciliary body; lumbar spinal ganglion; duodenum; genital tubercle; More reference expression data
BioGPS	n/a
Gene ontology
Molecular function	hydrolase activity; hydrolase activity, acting on ester bonds; lipase activity; sterol esterase activity
Cellular component	lysosome; fibrillar center; lysosomal lumen; intracellular membrane-bounded organelle
Biological process	lipid catabolic process; homeostasis of number of cells within a tissue; cytokine production; cell population proliferation; inflammatory response; tissue remodeling; cell morphogenesis; lung development; lipid metabolism; low-density lipoprotein particle clearance; sterol metabolic process; cellular lipid metabolic process
Sources:Amigo / QuickGO
Orthologs
Databases	NCBI: entry; OMA: entry
Species	Human	Mouse
Entrez	3988	16889
Ensembl	ENSG00000107798	ENSMUSG00000024781
UniProt	P38571	Q9Z0M5
RefSeq (mRNA)	NM_000235; NM_001127605; NM_001288979	NM_001111100; NM_021460
RefSeq (protein)	NP_000226; NP_001121077; NP_001275908	NP_001104570; NP_067435
Location (UCSC)	Chr 10: 89.21 – 89.41 Mb	Chr 19: 34.47 – 34.5 Mb
PubMed search
- Wikidata
View/Edit Human	View/Edit Mouse

Lysosomal lipase (also called lipase A) is an enzyme which in humans is encoded by the gene LIPA. As a lipase, Lysosomal lipase helps break down fats like triglycerides by removing fatty acids. Notably, it can also act as a sterol esterase, meaning it is able to remove fatty acids attached to cholesterol molecules (as part of cholesteryl esters). As its name suggests, it is located in lysosomes, which are organelles inside of cells which function to break down large molecules like proteins, carbohydrates, and lipids. Alternatively spliced transcript variants have been found for this gene.

== Function ==
This enzyme functions in the lysosome to catalyze the hydrolysis of cholesteryl esters and triglycerides, leading to the production of free cholesterol and fatty acids. Notably, LAL is the only known acid lipase that hydrolyzes cholesteryl esters and triglycerides within the lysosomal environment.

LAL is essential to intracellular lipid metabolism in macrophages and hepatocytes. Upon uptake of LDL by endocytosis, cholesteryl esters and triglycerides are transported to lysosomes where they are hydrolyzed by LAL. The resulting free cholesterol either exits the lysosome for future use in membrane synthesis or is re-esterified in the endoplasmic reticulum by ACAT to form lipid droplets. This process is important for foam cell formation during atherogenesis.

Lysosomal lipases function optimally at an acidic pH which are complementary with the environment found in the lysosomal lumen. These enzymes were believed to only hydrolyze the lipids found in organelle membranes and extracellular lipids. However, recent studies suggest that lysosomal lipases also play a significant role in the degradation of cytosolic lipids, a characteristic that was previously limited to neutral lipases. The ability of the lysosome to degrade a diverse set of cargo is attributed to the lysosomal lipase and other soluble hydrolases. These enzymes include sulphatases, phosphatases, peptidases, glycosidases, and nucleases.

The biochemical role of these enzymes are observed in various pathways, specifically in lipid catabolism. At the intracellular level, the byproducts released by the lysosomal lipase are recycled for membrane assembly and energy production. In addition, these enzymes participate in the production of specific fatty acids necessary for the metabolic reprogramming of CD8+ memory T cells, macrophage alternative activation, and lipid mediator synthesis. As observed, the degradation of these lipids are essential to maintain homeostasis within the body. The absence or decreased activity of this enzyme could lead to various metabolic disorders.

== Clinical significance ==
Mutations in the LIPA gene that cause loss-of-function can result in infant-onset Wolman disease, caused by a complete lack of LAL production, or a later-onset Cholesterol ester storage disease (CESD), caused by a 5-10% reduction in LAL production.

Chlorpromazine is an inhibitor of lysosomal lipase.

A genome wide survey suggests that lysosomal lipase A (located at chromosome 10q23.31) is associated with coronary artery disease in humans. LAL was found to have high expression in macrophages located in atherosclerotic plaques, where its activity contributes to the accumulation of lipid droplets and the progression of plaque development.

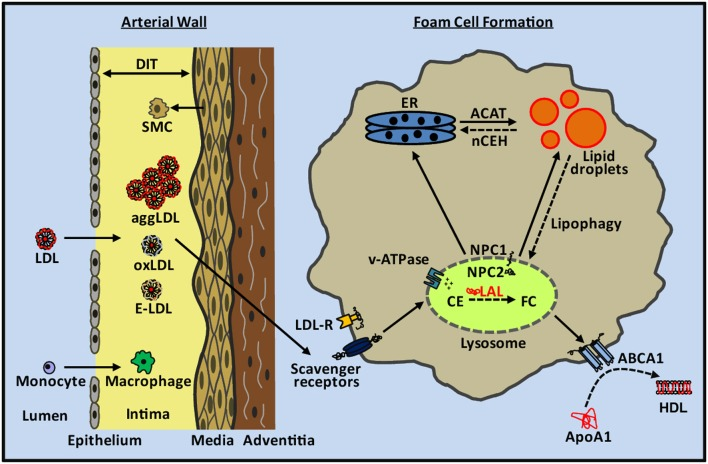
Schematic overview of LAL function in lipid metabolism. LDL is hydrolyzed by LAL in the lysosome, producing free cholesterol, which either leaves the cell or is re-esterified in the endoplasmic reticulum by ACAT to form lipid droplets, the foundation of foam cells.
