= Ludwig N. Hantson =

Belgium businessman (born 1962)

- Born: Ludwig Norbert Michel Hantson; August 1962 (age 64)
- Education: University of Louvain
- Known for: former president and CEO, Baxalta
- Title: CEO, Alexion Pharmaceuticals

Ludwig Norbert Michel Hantson (born August 1962) is a Belgium businessman, the CEO of Alexion Pharmaceuticals since March 2017. He was the president and CEO of Baxalta, an American biopharmaceutical company, from 2015 to 2016.

== Early life ==
Hantson received a PhD in Motor Rehabilitation and Physical Therapy from the University of Louvain in Belgium.

== Career ==
Hantson was corporate vice president and president, international of Baxter from May 2010, before becoming CEO of Baxalta from July 2015, when Baxalta was spun off by its parent company, Baxter International until the finalization of Baxalta's acquisition a year later (completed June 2016) by Shire.

It was reported in January 2016 that Hantson's exit package, in cash and Shire stock, could be more than $30 million.

In March 2017, Alexion Pharmaceuticals named Hantson as its CEO.

In September 2017, Hantson relocated Alexion Pharmaceuticals's headquarters to Massachusetts.

He is a director of Hologic.
