= Lysosomal acid lipase deficiency =

- Other names: Wolman disease
- LAL-D has an autosomal recessive pattern of inheritance.
- Specialty: Medical genetics, hepatology
- Usual onset: congenital

Lysosomal acid lipase deficiency (LAL deficiency or LAL-D) or Wolman disease, is an autosomal recessive inborn error of metabolism that results in the body not producing enough active lysosomal acid lipase (LAL) enzyme. This enzyme plays an important role in breaking down fatty material (cholesteryl esters and triglycerides) in the body. Infants, children, and adults who have LAL deficiency experience a range of serious health problems. The lack of the LAL enzyme can lead to a build-up of fatty material in several body organs, including the liver, spleen, gut, the wall of blood vessels, and other important organs.

The classic presentation is vomiting and failure to thrive or failure to gain weight in a newborn, with chalky bilateral adrenal calcifications on imaging, with life expectancy rarely exceeding a year. Very low levels of the LAL enzyme lead to LAL deficiency. LAL deficiency typically affects infants in the first year of life. The accumulation of fat in the walls of the gut in early-onset disease leads to serious digestive problems, including malabsorption, a condition in which the gut fails to absorb nutrients and calories from food. Because of these digestive complications, affected infants usually fail to grow and gain weight at the expected rate for their age (failure to thrive). As the disease progresses, it can cause life-threatening liver dysfunction or liver failure.

Infants are chronically ill from birth, and rarely survive beyond the first year of life. In 2015, an enzyme replacement therapy, sebelipase alfa, was approved in the US and EU. The therapy was additionally approved in Japan in 2016.

== Signs and symptoms ==
Infants may present with feeding difficulties, with frequent vomiting, diarrhea, swelling of the abdomen, and failure to gain weight or sometimes weight loss.

As the disease progresses in infants, increasing fat accumulation in the liver leads to other complications, including yellowing of the skin and whites of the eyes (jaundice), and a persistent low-grade fever. An ultrasound examination shows an accumulation of chalky material (calcification) in the adrenal gland in about half of infants with LAL-D. Complications of LAL-D progress over time, eventually leading to life-threatening problems, such as extremely low levels of circulating red blood cells (severe anemia), liver dysfunction or failure, and physical wasting (cachexia).

Older children or adults generally present with a wide range of signs and symptoms that overlap with other disorders. They may have diarrhoea, stomach pain, vomiting, or poor growth, a sign of malabsorption. They may have signs of bile-duct problems, like itchiness, jaundice, pale stool, or dark urine. Their feces may be excessively greasy. They often have an enlarged liver, liver disease, and may have yellowish deposits of fat underneath the skin, usually around their eyelids. The disease is often undiagnosed in adults. The person may have a history of premature cardiac disease or premature stroke.

== Cause ==
Lysosomal acid lipase deficiency is a genetic disease that is autosomal recessive. It is an inborn error of metabolism that causes a lysosomal storage disease. The condition is caused by a mutation of the LIPA gene, which encodes the lysosomal lipase protein (also called lysosomal acid lipase or LAL), that results in a loss of the protein's normal function. When LAL functions normally, it breaks down cholesteryl esters and triglycerides in low-density lipoprotein particles into free cholesterol and free fatty acids that the body can reuse; when LAL does not function, cholesteryl esters and triglycerides build up in the liver, spleen, and other organs. The accumulation of fat in the walls of the gut and other organs in leads to serious digestive problems, including malabsorption, a condition in which the gut fails to absorb nutrients and calories from food, persistent and often forceful vomiting, frequent diarrhea, foul-smelling and fatty stools (steatorrhea), and failure to grow.

Lysosomal acid lipase deficiencies occur when a person has defects (mutations) in both copies of the LIPA gene. Each parent of a person with LAL-D carries one copy of the defective LIPA gene. With every pregnancy, parents with a son or daughter affected by LAL deficiency have a one in four (25%) chance of having another affected child. A person born with defects in both LIPA genes is not able to produce adequate amounts of the LAL enzyme.

== Diagnosis ==
Blood tests may show anaemia with lipid profiles that are generally similar to people with more common familial hypercholesterolemia, including elevated total cholesterol, elevated low-density lipoprotein cholesterol, decreased high-density lipoprotein cholesterol, and elevated serum transaminases.

Liver biopsy findings generally show a bright yellow-orange color, enlarged, lipid-laden hepatocytes and Kupffer cells, microvesicular and macrovesicular steatosis, fibrosis, and cirrhosis. The only definitive tests are genetic, which may be conducted in any number of ways.

== Screening ==
Because LAL deficiency is inherited, each sibling of an affected individual has a 25% chance of having pathological mutations in LAL genes from both their mother and their father, a 50% chance of having a pathological mutation in only one gene, and a 25% chance of having no pathological mutations. Genetic testing for family members and genetic prenatal diagnosis of pregnancies for women who are at increased risk are possible if family members carrying pathological mutations have been identified.

== Management ==
LAL deficiency can be treated with sebelipase alfa, a recombinant form of LAL that was approved in 2015 in the US and EU. The disease of LAL affects < 0.2 in 10,000 people in the EU. According to an estimate by a Barclays analyst, the drug will be priced at about US$375,000 per year.

It is administered once a week via intravenous infusion in people with rapidly progressing disease in the first six months of life. In people with less aggressive disease, it is given every other week.

Before the drug was approved, treatment of infants was mainly focused on reducing specific complications and was provided in specialized centers. Specific interventions for infants included changing from breast milk or normal bottle formula to a specialized low-fat formula, intravenous feeding, antibiotics for infections, and steroid replacement therapy because of concerns about adrenal function.

Statins were used in people with LAL-D before the approval of sebelipase alfa; they helped control cholesterol, but did not appear to slow liver damage; liver transplantation was necessary for most patients.

== Prognosis ==
Infants with LAL deficiencies typically show signs of disease in the first weeks of life, and if untreated, die within 6–12 months due to multiple organ failure. Older children or adults with LAL-D may remain undiagnosed or be misdiagnosed until they die early from a heart attack or stroke or die suddenly of liver failure. The first enzyme-replacement therapy was approved in 2015. In those clinical trials, nine infants were followed for one year; six of them lived beyond one year. Older children and adults were followed for 36 weeks.

== Epidemiology ==
Depending on ethnicity and geography, prevalence has been estimated to be between one in 40,000 and one in 300,000; based on these estimates, the disease may be underdiagnosed. Jewish infants of Iraqi or Iranian origin appear to be most at risk based on a study of a community in Los Angeles in which a prevalence of one in 4200 was found.

== History ==
In 1956, Moshe Wolman, along with two other doctors, published the first case study of an LAL deficiency in a child born to closely related Persian Jews; 12 years later, a case study on an older boy was published, which turned out to be the first case study of LAL-D.

LAL-D was historically referred to as two separate disorders:

- Wolman disease, presenting in infant patients
- Cholesteryl ester storage disease, presenting in pediatric and adult patients

Around 2010, both presentations came to be known as LAL-D, as both are due to a deficiency of the LAL enzyme.

== Research directions ==
Some children with LAL-D have had an experimental therapy called hematopoietic stem cell transplantation, also known as bone marrow transplant, to try to prevent the disease from getting worse. Data are sparse, but a high risk of serious complications, including death and graft-versus-host disease, is known.
