= Osteoid =

Unmineralized, organic portion of the bone matrix

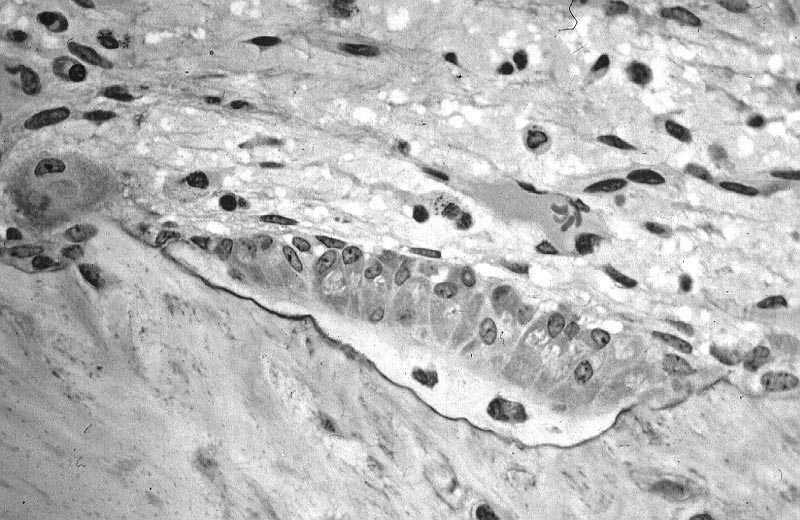
- Light micrograph of osteoid, containing two osteocytes, being synthesized by osteoblasts.

Identifiers
- FMA: 66830

In histology, osteoid is the unmineralized, organic portion of the bone matrix that forms prior to the maturation of bone tissue. Osteoblasts begin the process of forming bone tissue by secreting the osteoid as several specific proteins. The osteoid and its adjacent bone cells have developed into new bone tissue when it becomes mineralized.

Osteoid makes up about fifty percent of bone volume and forty percent of bone weight. It is composed of fibers and ground substance. The predominant type of fiber is type I collagen and comprises ninety percent of the osteoid. The ground substance is mostly made up of chondroitin sulfate and osteocalcin. Osteoblasts synthesize and secrete osteoid as an unmineralized organic matrix, and when the osteoid becomes mineralized through deposition of calcium salts, it transforms into mature bone tissue.

== Composition ==
Osteoid is primarily composed of Type I collagen and ground substance.

=== Collagen fibers ===
Type I collagen comprises approximately 85-95% of the organic matrix, providing the structural scaffold and tensile strength necessary for bone formation. These collagen fibers form a dense, highly cross-linked network that serves as the foundation for subsequent mineralization.

The collagen molecules are arranged in layers that alternate parallel and orthogonal to the axis of stress loading, creating a sophisticated composite structure.

=== Ground substance ===
The ground substance of osteoid comprises approximately 10% of the bone matrix and includes non-collagenous proteins:

- Proteoglycans - Including chondroitin sulfate and heparan sulfate, which bind to collagen and may regulate collagen fibril diameters and play a role in mineralization
- Osteocalcin - A bone-specific protein involved in binding calcium during the mineralization process
- Osteonectin - May serve a bridging function between collagen and the mineral component
- Bone sialoprotein - Proteins rich in sialic acid that participate in matrix organization
- Growth factors - Including transforming growth factors, fibroblast growth factors, and insulin-like growth factors

== Formation and secretion ==
Osteoid is synthesized and secreted by osteoblasts, specialized bone-forming cells. Osteoblasts are large cuboidal cells characterized by abundant rough endoplasmic reticulum, reflecting their high synthetic activity.

At their apical surface, osteoblasts secrete large amounts of type I collagen and smaller amounts of matrix organizing proteins, including osteocalcin and osteopontin. The newly secreted osteoid forms a hydrated protein matrix layer between the mineralization front and the osteoblast layer.

The synthesis of bone matrix occurs in two main steps: deposition of organic matrix (osteoid) and its subsequent mineralization. During active bone formation, osteoblasts continuously produce osteoid matrix until mineralization occurs.

== Mineralization ==
The transformation of osteoid into mineralized bone involves the deposition of hydroxyapatite crystals [Ca_{10}(PO_{4})_{6}OH_{2}] within the organic matrix.

=== Mechanism of mineralization ===
Mineralization occurs in two phases: the vesicular phase and the fibrillar phase.

Vesicular phase: Matrix vesicles, measuring 30-200 nm in diameter, are released from the apical membrane of osteoblasts into the newly formed bone matrix. These vesicles contain alkaline phosphatase, adenosine triphosphatase (ATPase), and inorganic pyrophosphatase, and act as seeding sites for hydroxyapatite crystal formation through localized enzymatic accumulation of calcium and phosphate.

Role of alkaline phosphatase: Osteoblasts secrete alkaline phosphatase, which participates in bone mineralization by hydrolyzing pyrophosphate, an inhibitor of mineralization, thereby increasing local inorganic phosphate availability for hydroxyapatite formation.

Crystal propagation: Crystal growth proceeds from initial foci in matrix vesicles to form spheroids, which gradually coalesce to form a network of apatite crystals. As the matrix matures, hydroxyapatite microcrystals are organized into a sophisticated composite within the collagen layer by nucleation in the protein lattice.

== Clinical significance ==
=== Disorders of osteoid mineralization ===
Defective mineralization of osteoid leads to several important clinical conditions characterized by accumulation of unmineralized matrix.

Rickets: Occurs in children when defective mineralization affects the growth plate and osteoid. The condition results from calcium or phosphate deficiency, either isolated or secondary to vitamin D deficiency. In rickets, the mineralization defect leads to accumulation of osteoid in bone tissue below the growth plate, resulting in weak bones and deformities.

Osteomalacia: The adult equivalent of rickets, osteomalacia is characterized by softened bones due to impaired mineralization of osteoid. Vitamin D deficiency is the most common cause, though calcium or phosphate deficiency can also result in osteomalacia. The condition manifests as bone pain, muscle weakness, and increased fracture risk.

Histomorphometric characteristics of osteomalacia include:

- Prolonged mineralization lag time (greater than 100 days)
- Widened osteoid seams (increased osteoid thickness)
- Increased osteoid volume

Vitamin D metabolism disorders: Rickets and osteomalacia develop in various clinical situations and have in common an absence or delay in the mineralization of growth cartilage and newly formed bone collagen. Deficiency of vitamin D, essential for absorption of dietary calcium, has been a major cause historically.

=== Osteoid in bone tumors ===
Osteosarcoma: The most common primary malignant bone tumor, osteosarcoma is characterized by malignant cells that produce osteoid. Osteosarcoma is a primary malignant tumour of the skeleton characterized by the direct formation of immature bone or osteoid tissue by the tumour cells.

The production of osteoid by tumor cells is the histological hallmark distinguishing osteosarcoma from other bone tumors. The malignant osteoid produced appears as irregular, immature structures in close proximity to malignant cells with enlarged hyperchromatic nuclei and abnormal mitotic figures.

Osteoid osteoma: A benign bone-forming tumor characterized by formation of osteoid tissue, typically causing localized bone pain that worsens at night.

== Role in bone remodeling ==
Osteoid plays a central role in the continuous process of bone remodeling. During the bone formation phase of remodeling, osteoblasts deposit new osteoid at sites previously resorbed by osteoclasts.

The bone remodeling cycle involves distinct phases:

1. Activation: Recruitment of osteoclasts to specific bone sites
2. Resorption: Osteoclastic removal of old bone
3. Reversal: Transition from resorption to formation
4. Formation: Osteoblastic deposition of new osteoid
5. Mineralization: Transformation of osteoid into mineralized bone

Throughout this process, osteoblasts produce the unmineralized organic matrix that subsequently undergoes calcification to form new bone tissue.

== Biochemical markers ==
Several biochemical markers are associated with osteoid metabolism and bone formation:

- Alkaline phosphatase: Secreted by osteoblasts during active bone formation; elevated levels indicate increased osteoid production
- Osteocalcin: A bone-specific protein synthesized by osteoblasts and incorporated into osteoid; serves as a marker of bone formation
- Type I collagen peptides: Degradation products measured to assess bone turnover

== Physiology ==
To allow bone mineralization to take place, osteoblasts secrete tissue-nonspecific alkaline phosphatase into the osteoid to break down pyrophosphate, an extracellular inhibitor of hydroxyapatite precipitation which otherwise prevents precipitation of hydroxyapetite crystals from extracellular fluid which is supersaturated in Ca^{2+} and PO^{3−}_{4} ions.

== Disorders ==
When there are insufficient nutrient minerals or osteoblast dysfunction, the osteoid does not mineralize properly and accumulates. The resultant disorder is termed rickets in children and osteomalacia in adults. A deficiency of type I collagen, such as in osteogenesis imperfecta, also leads to defective osteoid and brittle, fracture-prone bones.

In some cases, secondary hyperparathyroidism can cause a disturbance in mineralisation of calcium and phosphate.

Another condition is a disturbance in primitive transformed cells of mesenchymal origin, which exhibit osteoblastic differentiation and produce malignant osteoid. This results in the formation of a malignant primary bone tumor known as osteosarcoma or osteogenic sarcoma. This malignancy most often develops in adolescence during periods of rapid osteoid formation (commonly referred to as growth spurts).

== See also ==
- Bone
- Bone matrix
- Osteoblast
- Osteocyte
- Bone mineralization
- Hydroxyapatite
- Rickets
- Osteomalacia
- Osteosarcoma
- Alkaline phosphatase
