= Osteitis fibrosa cystica =

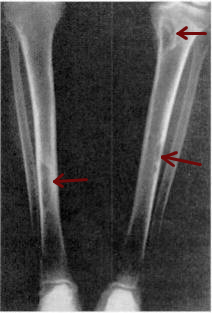
- Osteitis fibrosa cystica of the tibia. Arrows point to the brown tumors which are typically present in bones of people with OFC.
- Specialty: Endocrinology
- Symptoms: bone pain or tenderness, bone fractures, and skeletal deformities
- Causes: hyperparathyroidism

Osteitis fibrosa cystica (/ˌɒstiˈaɪtɪs faɪˈbroʊsə ˈsɪstɪkə/ OSS-tee-EYE-tis fy-BROH-sə SIS-tik-ə) is a skeletal disorder resulting in a loss of bone mass, a weakening of the bones as their calcified supporting structures are replaced with fibrous tissue (peritrabecular fibrosis), and the formation of cyst-like brown tumors in and around the bone. Osteitis fibrosis cystica (OFC), also known as osteitis fibrosa, osteodystrophia fibrosa, and von Recklinghausen's disease of bone (not to be confused with von Recklinghausen's disease, neurofibromatosis type I), is caused by hyperparathyroidism, which is a surplus of parathyroid hormone from over-active parathyroid glands. This surplus stimulates the activity of osteoclasts, cells that break down bone, in a process known as osteoclastic bone resorption. The hyperparathyroidism can be triggered by a parathyroid adenoma, hereditary factors, parathyroid carcinoma, or renal osteodystrophy. Osteoclastic bone resorption releases minerals, including calcium, from the bone into the bloodstream, causing both elevated blood calcium levels, and the structural changes which weaken the bone. The symptoms of the disease are the consequences of both the general softening of the bones and the excess calcium in the blood, and include bone fractures, kidney stones, nausea, moth-eaten appearance in the bones, appetite loss, and weight loss.

First described in the nineteenth century, OFC is currently detected through a combination of blood testing, X-rays, and tissue sampling. Before 1950, around half of those diagnosed with hyperparathyroidism in the United States saw it progress to OFC, but with early identification techniques and improved treatment methods, instances of OFC in developed countries are increasingly rare. Where treatment is required, it normally involves addressing the underlying hyperparathyroidism before commencing long-term treatment for OFC—depending on its cause and severity, this can range from hydration and exercise to surgical intervention.

== Classification ==
Osteitis fibrosa cystica is defined as the classic skeletal manifestation of advanced hyperparathyroidism. Under the ICD-10 classification system, established by the World Health Organization, OFC is listed under category E21.0, primary hyperparathyroidism.

== Signs and symptoms ==
The major symptoms of OFC are bone pain or tenderness, bone fractures, and skeletal deformities such as bowing of the bones. The underlying hyperparathyroidism may cause kidney stones, nausea, constipation, fatigue and weakness. X-rays may indicate thin bones, fractures, bowing, and cysts. Fractures are most commonly localized in the arms, legs, or spine.

The addition of weight loss, appetite loss, vomiting, polyuria, and polydipsia to the aforementioned symptoms may indicate that OFC is the result of parathyroid carcinoma. Parathyroid carcinoma, an uncommon cancer of the parathyroid glands, is generally indicated by serum calcium levels higher than usual, even in comparison to the high serum calcium levels that OFC generally presents with. Symptoms are also often more severe. Generally, the presence of a palpable neck mass is also indicative of the cancer, occurring in approximately 50% of patients, but virtually nonexistent in individuals with OFC with a different origin.

== Causes ==
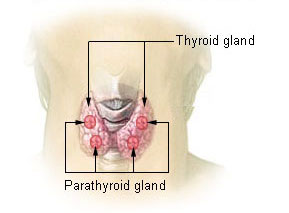
Diagram showing position of the parathyroid glands beside the thyroid

Osteitis fibrosa cystica is the result of unchecked hyperparathyroidism, or the overactivity of the parathyroid glands, which results in an overproduction of parathyroid hormone (PTH). PTH causes the release of calcium from the bones into the blood, and the reabsorption of calcium in the kidney. Thus, excess PTH in hyperparathyroidism causes elevated blood calcium levels, or hypercalcemia. There are four major causes of primary hyperparathyroidism that result in OFC:

- Parathyroid adenoma

The vast majority of cases of hyperparathyroidism are the result of the random formation of benign, but metabolically active, parathyroid adenoma swellings. These instances comprise approximately 80–85% of all documented cases of hyperparathyroidism.

- Hereditary factors

Approximately 1 in 10 documented cases of hyperparathyroidism are a result of hereditary factors. Disorders such as familial hyperparathyroidism, multiple endocrine neoplasia type 1 (MEN Type 1) and hyperparathyroidism-jaw tumor syndrome can, if left unchecked, result in OFC. MEN Type 1 is an autosomal dominant disorder and the most common hereditary form of hyperparathyroidism, affecting about 95% of genetic cases of OFC, and also tends to affect younger patients than other forms. Major mutations which can lead to hyperparathyroidism generally involve the parathyroid hormone receptor, G proteins, or adenylate cyclase. Certain genetic mutations have been linked to a higher rate of parathyroid carcinoma occurrence, specifically mutations to the gene HRPT2, which codes for the protein parafibromin.

- Parathyroid carcinoma

Parathyroid carcinoma (cancer of the parathyroid gland) is the rarest cause of OFC, accounting for about 0.5% of all cases of hyperparathyroidism. OFC onset by parathyroid carcinoma is difficult to diagnose.

- Renal complications

OFC is a common presentation of renal osteodystrophy, which is a term used to refer to the skeletal complications of end stage renal disease (ESRD). OFC occurs in approximately 50% of patients with ESRD. ESRD occurs when the kidneys fail to produce calcitriol, a form of vitamin D, which assists in the absorption of calcium into the bones. When calcitriol levels decrease, parathyroid hormone levels increase, halting the storage of calcium, and instead triggering its removal from the bones. The concept of renal osteodystrophy is currently included into the broader term chronic kidney disease-mineral and bone disorder (CKD-MBD).

- Fluoride intoxication

OFC was noticed in the early years of community fluoridation to be at higher risk when water supplies were fluoridated. Indeed, death rates which in some cases were gruesomely dramatic during dialysis quickly brought attention to the fact that fluoride in water during dialysis was a health hazard. Modern dialysis takes pains to de-fluoridate water in order to minimize bone disease including OFC. The 2006 National Research Council confirmed kidney patients are a sub-population particularly susceptible to ill effects from fluoride exposure which manifest in bones.

Fanconi syndrome: decrease amino acids, phosphate, glucose, bicarbonate and potassium salts.

== Pathophysiology ==
The effects of OFC on bone are largely dependent on the duration of the disease and the level of parathyroid hormone (PTH) produced. PTH is responsible for maintaining a homeostatic calcium concentration in the blood. It activates the parathyroid-hormone related protein receptor located on osteoclasts and osteocytes, both of which are responsible for the breakdown and maintaining of bone. Abnormalities affecting the parathyroid glands cause a surplus of PTH, which, in turn, increases the activity and frequency of osteoclasts and osteocytes. Increased PTH levels trigger the release of stored calcium through the dissolution of old bone, as well as the conservation of serum calcium through a cessation in the production of new bone.

Generally, the first bones to be affected are the fingers, facial bones, ribs, and pelvis. Long bones, which are longer than they are wide, are also among the first affected. As the disease progresses, any bone may be affected.

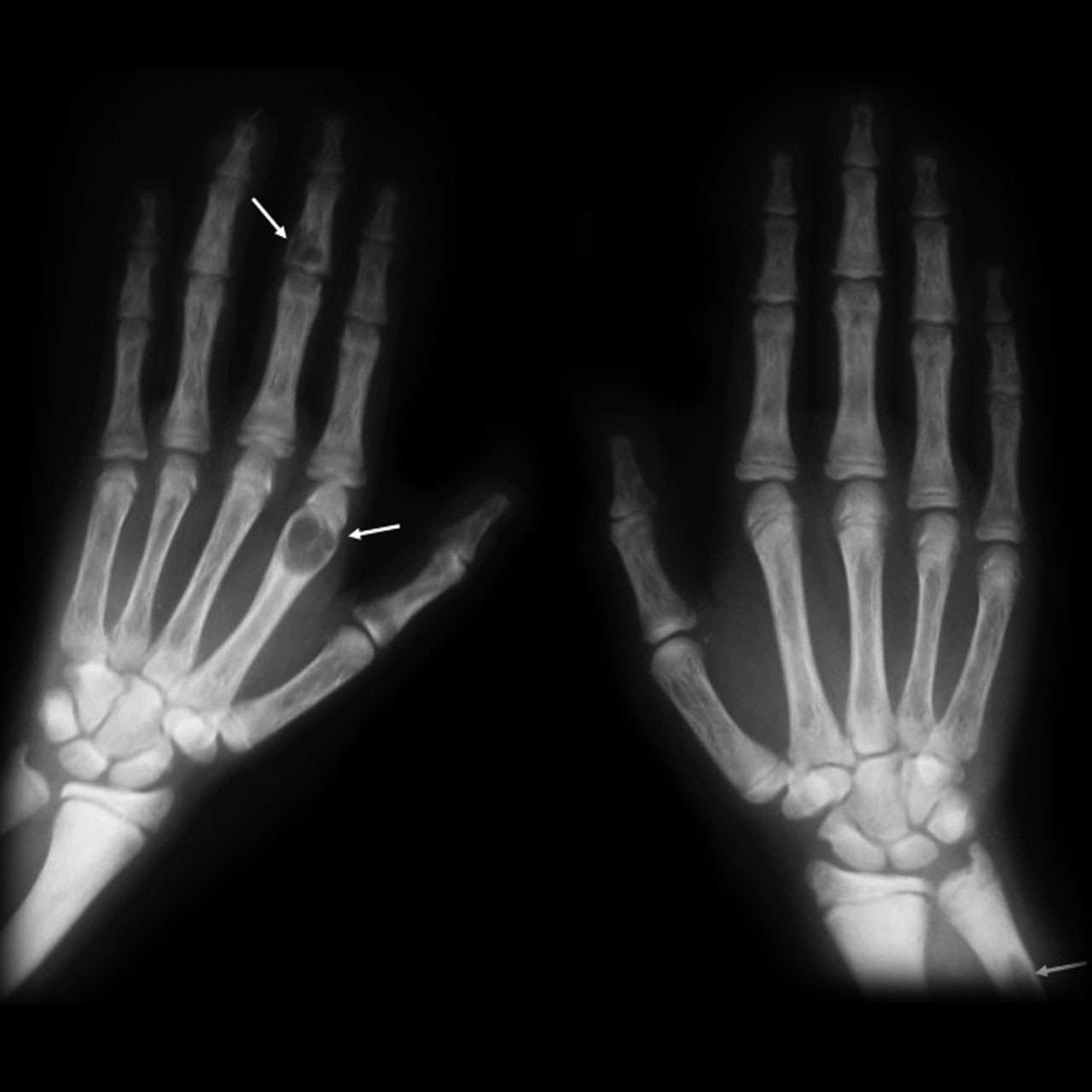
X-ray of the hands showing brown tumors in the long bones of the fingers

== Diagnosis ==
OFC may be diagnosed using a variety of techniques. Muscles in patients with OFC can either appear unaffected or "bulked up." If muscular symptoms appear upon the onset of hyperparathyroidism, they are generally sluggish contraction and relaxation of the muscles. Deviation of the trachea (a condition in which the trachea shifts from its position at the midline of the neck), in conjunction with other known symptoms of OFC can point to a diagnosis of parathyroid carcinoma.

Blood tests on patients with OFC generally show high levels of calcium (normal levels are considered to range between 8.5 and 10.2 mg/dL, parathyroid hormone (levels generally above 250 pg/mL, as opposed to the "normal" upper-range value of 65 pg/mL), and alkaline phosphatase (normal range is 20 to 140 IU/L).

X-rays may also be used to diagnose the disease. Usually, these X-rays will show extremely thin bones, which are often bowed or fractured. However, such symptoms are also associated with other bone diseases, such as osteopenia or osteoporosis. Generally, the first bones to show symptoms via X-ray are the fingers. Furthermore, brown tumors, especially when manifested on facial bones, can be misdiagnosed as cancerous. Radiographs distinctly show bone resorption and X-rays of the skull may depict an image often described as "ground glass" or "salt and pepper". Dental X-rays may also be abnormal.

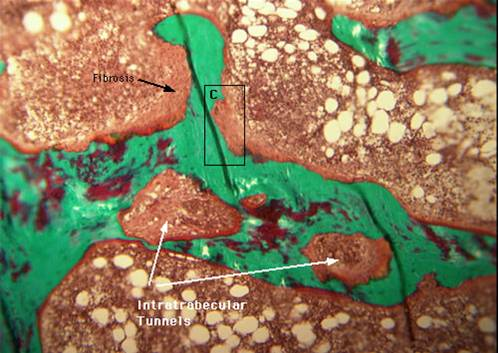
Histology of bone showing osteitis fibrosa cystica. (Fibrosis and intratrabecular tunnels are seen.)

Cysts may be lined by osteoclasts and sometimes blood pigments, which lend to the notion of "brown tumors." Such cysts can be identified with nuclear imaging combined with specific tracers, such as sestamibi. Identification of muscular degeneration or lack of reflex can occur through clinical testing of deep tendon reflexes, or via photomotogram (an achilles tendon reflex test).

Fine needle aspiration (FNA) can be used to biopsy bone lesions, once found on an X-ray or other scan. Such tests can be vital in diagnosis and can also prevent unnecessary treatment and invasive surgery. Conversely, FNA biopsy of tumors of the parathyroid gland is not recommended for diagnosing parathyroid carcinoma and may in fact be harmful, as the needle can puncture the tumor, leading to dissemination and the possible spread of cancerous cells.

The brown tumors commonly associated with OFC display many of the same characteristics of osteoclasts. These cells are characteristically benign, feature a dense, granular cytoplasm, and a nucleus that tends to be ovular in shape, enclosing comparatively fine chromatin. Nucleoli also tend to be smaller than average.

Comparison of bone pathology
Condition	Calcium	Phosphate	Alkaline phosphatase	Parathyroid hormone	Comments
Osteopenia	unaffected	unaffected	normal	unaffected	decreased bone mass
Osteopetrosis	unaffected	unaffected	elevated	unaffected	thick dense bones also known as marble bone
Osteomalacia and rickets	decreased	decreased	elevated	elevated	soft bones
Osteitis fibrosa cystica	elevated	decreased	elevated	elevated	brown tumors
Paget's disease of bone	unaffected	unaffected	variable (depending on stage of disease)	unaffected	abnormal bone architecture

== Management ==
=== Medical ===
Medical management of OFC consists of vitamin D treatment, generally alfacalcidol or calcitriol, delivered intravenously. Studies have shown that in cases of OFC caused by either end-stage renal disease or primary hyperparathyroidism, this method is successful not only in treating underlying hyperparathyroidism, but also in causing the regression of brown tumors and other symptoms of OFC.

=== Surgery ===
In especially severe cases of OFC, parathyroidectomy, or the full removal of the parathyroid glands, is the chosen route of treatment. Parathyroidectomy has been shown to result in the reversal of bone resorption and the complete regression of brown tumors. In situations where parathyroid carcinoma is present, surgery to remove the tumors has also led to the regression of hyperparathyroidism as well as the symptoms of OFC.

Bone transplants have proven successful in filling the lesions caused by OFC. A report showed that in 8 out of 11 instances where cavities caused by OFC were filled with transplanted bone, the lesion healed and the transplanted bone blended rapidly and seamlessly with the original bone.

== Prognosis ==
Almost all who undergo parathyroidectomy experience increased bone density and repair of the skeleton within weeks. Additionally, patients with OFC who have undergone parathyroidectomy begin to show regression of brown tumors within six months. Following parathyroidectomy, hypocalcaemia is common. This results from a combination of suppressed parathyroid glands due to prolonged hypercalcaemia, as well as the need for calcium and phosphate in the mineralization of new bone.

Thirty percent of patients with OFC-like tumors caused by metastatic parathyroid carcinoma who undergo surgery see a local recurrence of symptoms. The post-surgical survival rate hovers around seven years, while patients who do not undergo surgery have a survival rate of around five years.

== Epidemiology ==
Osteitis fibrosa cystica has long been a rare disease. Today, it appears in only 2% of individuals diagnosed with primary hyperparathyroidism, which accounts for 90% of instances of the disease. Primary hyperparathyroidism is three times as common in individuals with diabetes mellitus.

The hospitalization rate for hyperparathyroidism in the United States in 1999 was 8.0 out of 100,000. The disease has a definite tendency to affect younger individuals, typically appearing before the age of 40, with a study in 1922 reporting that 70% of cases display symptoms before the age of 20, and 85% before 35. Primary hyperparathyroidism, as well as OFC, is more common in Asiatic countries. Before treatment for hyperparathyroidism improved in the 1950s, half of those diagnosed with hyperparathyroidism saw it progress into OFC.

Rates of OFC increase alongside cases of unchecked primary hyperparathyroidism. In developing countries, such as India, rates of disease as well as case reports often mirror those published in past decades in the developed world.

The other 10% of cases are primarily caused by primary hyperplasia, or an increase of the number of cells. Parathyroid carcinoma accounts for less than 1% of all cases, occurring most frequently in individuals around 50 years of age (in stark contrast to OFC as a result of primary hyperparathyroidism) and showing no gender preference. Approximately 95% of hyperparathyroidism caused by genetic factors is attributed to MEN type 1. This mutation also tends to affect younger individuals.

== History ==
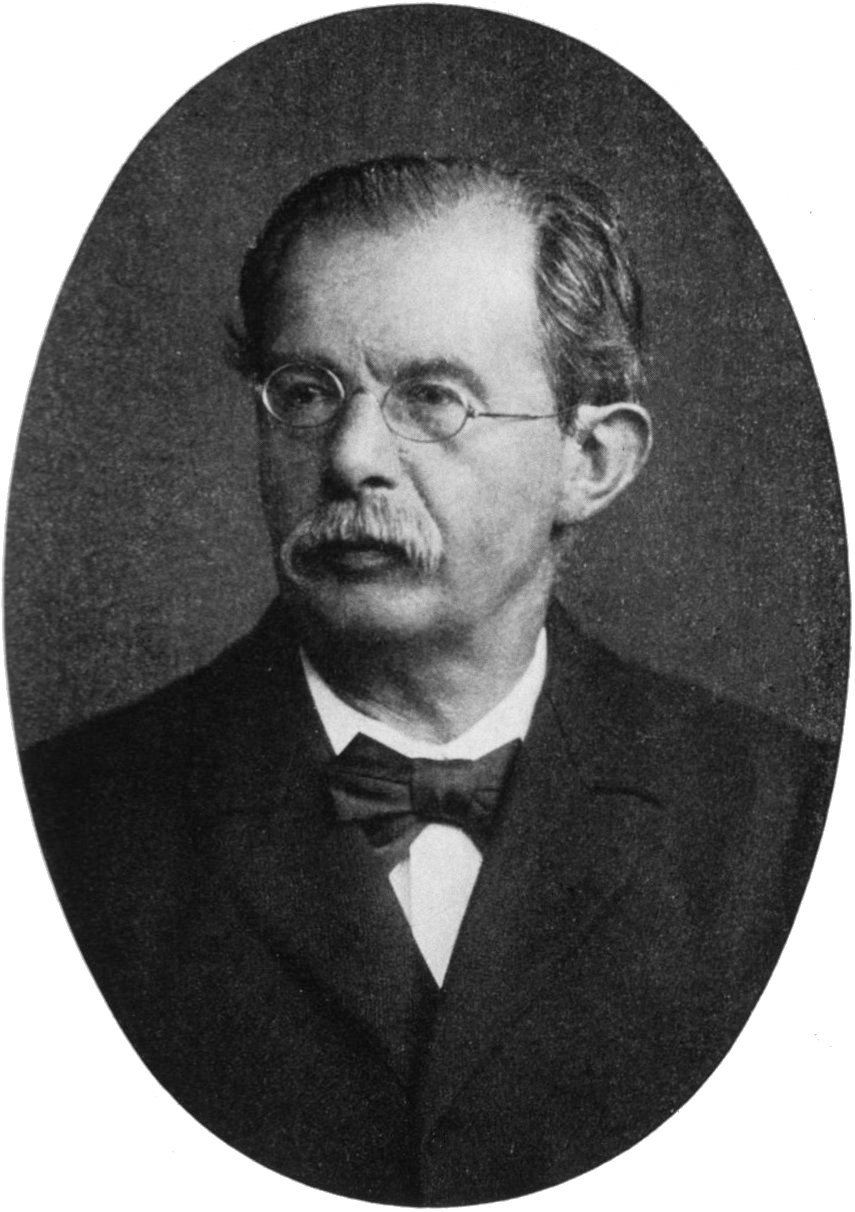
Friedrich Daniel von Recklinghausen, who is credited, along with Gerhard Engel, in naming OFC

The condition was first described by Gerhard Engel in 1864 and Friedrich Daniel von Recklinghausen in 1890, though William Hunter, who died in 1783, is credited with finding the first example of the disease. "von Recklinghausen's disease" (without the qualification "of bone") is a completely unrelated disorder, nowadays termed neurofibromatosis. In 1884, Davies Colley delivered a presentation to the Pathological Society of London that detailed the manifestation of hyperparathyroidism into a brown tumor of the mandible, as well as the histological makeup of the tumor.

The discovery and subsequent description of the parathyroid glands is credited to Ivar Sandstrom, though his publication, On a New Gland in Man and Several Mammals-Glandulae Parathyroideae, received little attention. Gustaf Retzius and Eugene Gley compounded his research, the latter credited with the discovery of the function of the parathyroid glands. This research cumulated in the first surgical removal of a parathyroid tumor by Felix Mandel in 1925. A 2.5 × 1.5-inch (64 × 38 mm) tumor was removed from the thyroid artery of a man with advanced OFC. The patient's symptoms disappeared, only to return in approximately six years as a result of renal stones that were diagnosed only after the patient had died. In 1932, blood tests on a female patient with renal stone-based OFC revealed extremely high blood calcium levels. Fuller Albright diagnosed and treated the woman, who had a large tumor of the neck as well as renal stones.

The first published literature to describe a brown tumor (which was linked to OFC) was published in 1953, though clinical reports from before 1953 do draw a correlation between the disease and tumors previous to the publication.

The advent of the multichannel autoanalyzer in the 1960s and 70s led to an increase in early diagnosis of primary hyperparathyroidism. This increase led to a sharp decline in the prolonged manifestation of the disease, leading to a drop in the number of cases of OFC due to the early detection of hyperparathyroidism. Before this invention, the diagnosis of primary hyperparathyroidism was generally prolonged until the emergence of severe manifestations, such as OFC.

== Bibliography ==
- Campbell N (1987). Biology. Menlo Park, Calif: Benjamin/Cummings Pub. Co. ISBN 978-0-8053-1840-1.
- Eberstein A, Goodgold J (1983). Electrodiagnosis of Neuromuscular Diseases. Baltimore: Williams & Wilkins. ISBN 978-0-683-03686-2.
- Ellis H (2002). A History of Surgery. London: Greenwich Medical Media. p. 210. ISBN 978-1-84110-181-1.
- Hricik D, Miller RT, Sedor JR (2003). Nephrology Secrets. Hanley & Belfus. p. 175. ISBN 978-1-56053-502-7.
- Levine MW, Bilezikian JP, Marcus R (2001). The Parathyroids: Basic and Clinical Concepts. Boston: Academic Press. ISBN 978-0-12-098651-4.
- Stevens A (1922). "The Practice of Medicine". W. B. Saunders Co.
- Patton KT, Thibodeau GA (1996). Anthony's Textbook of Anatomy & Physiology. St. Louis: Mosby. ISBN 978-0-8151-8861-2.
