= Benign tumor =

Mass of cells which cannot spread throughout the body

- Other names: Non-cancerous tumor
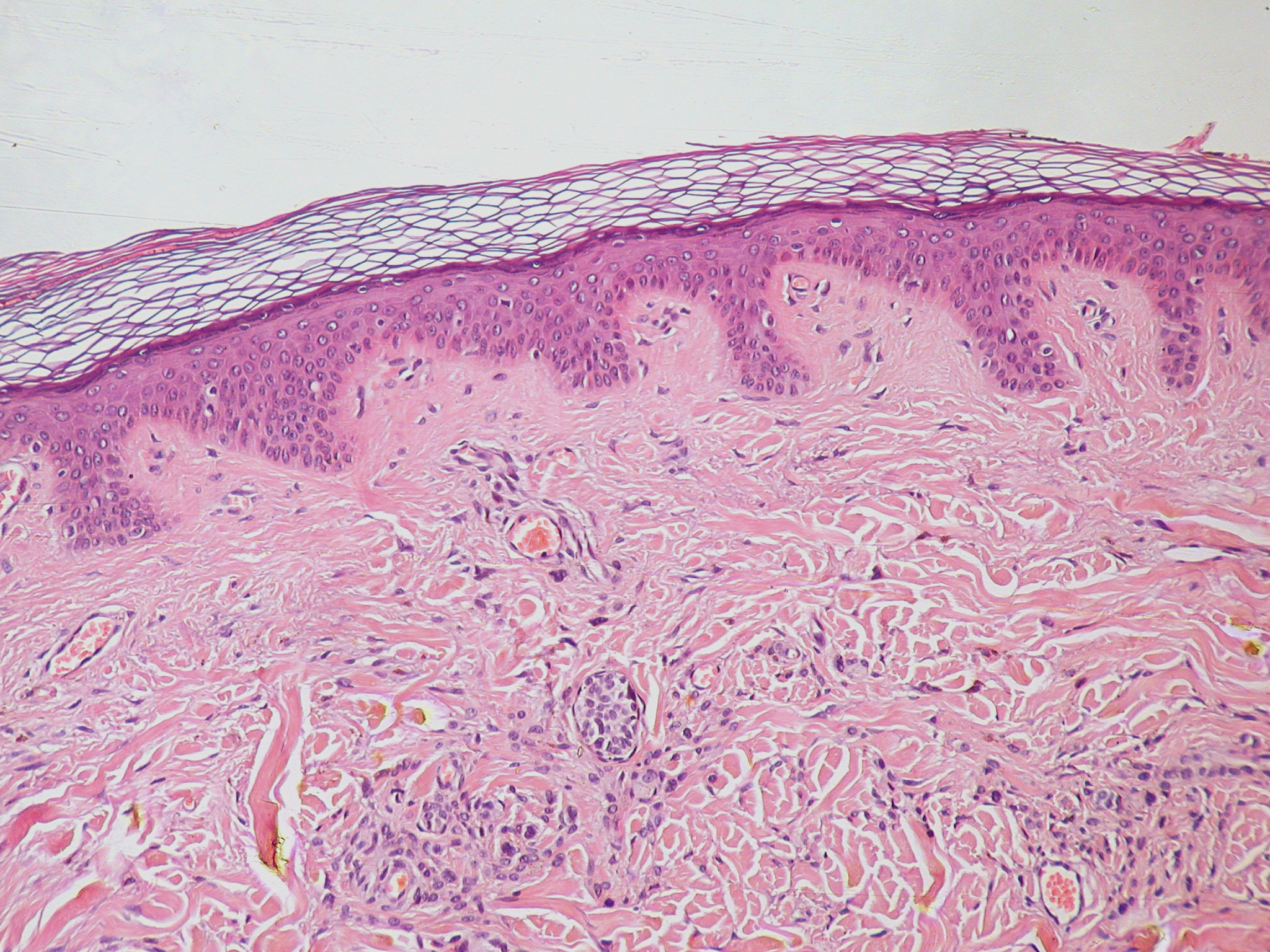
- Normal epidermis and dermis with intradermal nevus, 10x-cropped
- Specialty: Oncology, pathology

A benign tumor is a mass of cells (tumor) that does not invade neighboring tissue or metastasize (spread throughout the body). Compared to malignant (cancerous) tumors, benign tumors generally have a slower growth rate. Benign tumors have relatively well differentiated cells. They are often surrounded by an outer surface (fibrous sheath of connective tissue) or stay contained within the epithelium. Common examples of benign tumors include moles and uterine fibroids.

Some forms of benign tumors may be harmful to health. Benign tumor growth causes a mass effect that can compress neighboring tissues. This can lead to nerve damage, blood flow reduction (ischemia), tissue death (necrosis), or organ damage. The health effects of benign tumor growth may be more prominent if the tumor is contained within an enclosed space such as the cranium, respiratory tract, sinus, or bones. For example, unlike most benign tumors elsewhere in the body, benign brain tumors can be life-threatening. Tumors may exhibit behaviors characteristic of their cell type of origin; as an example, endocrine tumors such as thyroid adenomas and adrenocortical adenomas may overproduce certain hormones.

The word benign means 'favourable, kind, fortunate, salutary, propitious'. However, a benign tumor is not benign in the usual sense; the name merely specifies that it is not "malignant", i.e. cancerous. While benign tumors usually do not pose a serious health risk, they can be harmful or fatal. Many types of benign tumors have the potential to become cancerous (malignant) through a process known as tumor progression. For this reason and other possible harms, some benign tumors are removed by surgery. When removed, benign tumors usually do not return. Exceptions to this rule may indicate malignant transformation.

== Signs and symptoms ==
Benign tumors are very diverse; they may be asymptomatic or may cause specific symptoms, depending on their anatomic location and tissue type. They grow outward, producing large, rounded masses which can cause what is known as a "mass effect". This growth can cause compression of local tissues or organs, leading to many effects, such as blockage of ducts, reduced blood flow (ischaemia), tissue death (necrosis) and nerve pain or damage. Some tumors also produce hormones that can lead to life-threatening situations. Insulinomas can produce large amounts of insulin, causing hypoglycemia. Pituitary adenomas can cause elevated levels of hormones such as growth hormone and insulin-like growth factor-1, which cause acromegaly; prolactin; ACTH and cortisol, which cause Cushing's disease; TSH, which causes hyperthyroidism; and FSH and LH. Bowel intussusception can occur with various benign colonic tumors. Cosmetic effects can be caused by tumors, especially those of the skin, possibly causing psychological or social discomfort for the person with the tumor. Vascular tissue tumors can bleed, in some cases leading to anemia.

== Causes ==
=== PTEN hamartoma syndrome ===
PTEN hamartoma syndrome encompasses hamartomatous disorders characterized by genetic mutations in the PTEN tumor suppressor gene, including Cowden syndrome, Bannayan–Riley–Ruvalcaba syndrome, Proteus syndrome and Proteus-like syndrome. Absent or dysfunctional PTEN protein allows cells to over-proliferate, causing hamartomas. Cowden syndrome is an autosomal dominant genetic disorder characterized by multiple benign hamartomas (trichilemmomas and mucocutaneous papillomatous papules) as well as a predisposition for cancers of multiple organs including the breast and thyroid. Bannayan–Riley–Ruvalcaba syndrome is a congenital disorder characterized by hamartomatous intestinal polyposis, macrocephaly, lipomatosis, hemangiomatosis and glans penis macules. Proteus syndrome is characterized by nevi, asymmetric overgrowth of various body parts, adipose tissue dysregulation, cystadenomas, adenomas, vascular malformation.

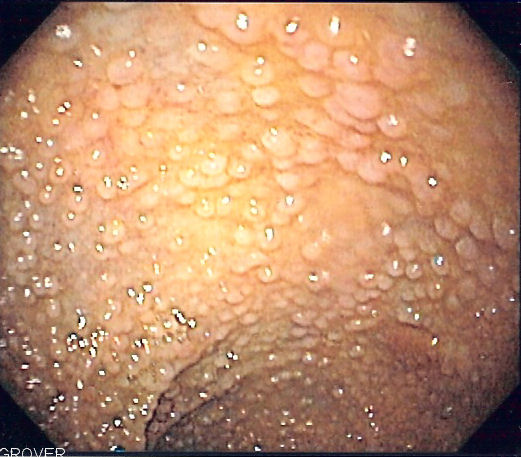
Endoscopic image of sigmoid colon of a patient with familial adenomatous polyposis

=== Familial adenomatous polyposis ===
Familial adenomatous polyposis (FAP) is a familial cancer syndrome caused by mutations in the APC gene. In FAP, adenomatous polyps are present in the colon. The polyps progress into colon cancer unless removed. The APC gene is a tumor suppressor. Its protein product is involved in many cellular processes. Inactivation of the APC gene leads to the buildup of a protein called β-catenin. This protein activates two transcription factors: T-cell factor (TCF) and lymphoid enhancer factor (LEF). These factors cause the upregulation of many genes involved in cell proliferation, differentiation, migration and apoptosis (programmed cell death), causing the growth of benign tumors.

=== Tuberous sclerosis complex ===
Tuberous sclerosis complex (TSC) is an autosomal dominant genetic disorder caused by mutations in the genes TSC1 and TSC2. TSC1 produces the protein hamartin. TSC2 produces the protein tuberin. This disorder presents with many benign hamartomatous tumors including angiofibromas, renal angiomyolipomas, and pulmonary lymphangiomyomatosis. Tuberin and hamartin inhibit the mTOR protein in normal cellular physiology. Inactivation of the TSC tumor suppressors causes an increase in mTOR activity. This leads to the activation of genes and the production of proteins that increase cell growth.

=== Von Hippel–Lindau disease ===
Von Hippel–Lindau disease is a dominantly inherited cancer syndrome that significantly increases the risk of various tumors. This includes benign hemangioblastomas and malignant pheochromocytomas, renal cell carcinomas, pancreatic endocrine tumors, and endolymphatic sac tumors. It is caused by genetic mutations in the Von Hippel–Lindau tumor suppressor gene. The VHL protein (pVHL) is involved in cellular signaling in oxygen starved (hypoxic) cells. One role of pVHL is to cause the cellular degradation of another protein, HIF1α. Dysfunctional pVHL leads to accumulation of HIF1α. This activates several genes responsible for the production of substances involved in cell growth and blood vessel production: VEGF, PDGFβ, TGFα and erythropoietin.

=== Bone tumors ===
Benign tumors of bone can be similar macroscopically and require a combination of a clinical history with cytogenetic, molecular, and radiologic tests for diagnosis. Three common forms of benign bone tumors with are giant cell tumor of bone, osteochondroma, and enchondroma; other forms of benign bone tumors exist but may be less prevalent.

==== Giant cell tumors ====
Giant cell tumors of bone frequently occur in long bone epiphyses of the appendicular skeleton or the sacrum of the axial skeleton. Local growth can cause destruction of neighboring cortical bone and soft tissue, leading to pain and limiting range of motion. The characteristic radiologic finding of giant cell tumors of bone is a lytic lesion that does not have marginal sclerosis of bone. On histology, giant cells of fused osteoclasts are seen as a response to neoplastic mononucleated cells. Notably, giant cells are not unique among benign bone tumors to giant cell tumors of bone. Molecular characteristics of the neoplastic cells causing giant cell tumors of bone indicate an origin of pluripotent mesenchymal stem cells that adopt preosteoblastic markers. Cytogenetic causes of giant cell tumors of bone involve telomeres. Treatment involves surgical curettage with adjuvant bisphosphonates.

==== Osteochondroma ====
Osteochondromas form cartilage-capped projections of bone. Structures such as the marrow cavity and cortical bone of the osteochondroma are contiguous to those of the originating bone. Sites of origin often involve metaphyses of long bones. While many osteochondromas occur spontaneously, there are cases in which several osteochondromas can occur in the same individual; these may be linked to a genetic condition known as hereditary multiple osteochondromas. Osteochondroma appears on X-ray as a projecting mass that often points away from joints. These tumors stop growing with the closure of the parental bone's growth plates. Failure to stop growth can be indicative of transformation to malignant chondrosarcoma. Treatment is not indicated unless symptomatic. In that case, surgical excision is often curative.

==== Enchondroma ====
Enchondromas are benign tumors of hyaline cartilage. Within a bone, enchondromas are often found in metaphyses. They can be found in many types of bone, including small bones, long bones, and the axial skeleton. X-ray of enchondromas shows well-defined borders and a stippled appearance. Presentation of multiple enchondromas is consistent with multiple enchondromatosis (Ollier Disease). Treatment of enchondromas involves surgical curettage and grafting.

=== Benign soft tissue tumors ===
==== Lipomas ====
Lipomas are benign, subcutaneous tumors of fat cells (adipocytes). They are usually painless, slow-growing, and mobile masses that can occur anywhere in the body where there are fat cells, but are typically found on the trunk and upper extremities. Although lipomas can develop at any age, they more commonly appear between the ages of 40 and 60. Lipomas affect about 1% of the population, with no documented sex bias, and about 1 in every 1000 people will have a lipoma within their lifetime. The cause of lipomas is not well defined. Genetic or inherited causes of lipomas play a role in around 2-3% of patients. In individuals with inherited familial syndromes such as Proteus syndrome or Familial multiple lipomatosis, it is common to see multiple lipomas across the body. These syndromes are also associated with specific symptoms and sub-populations. Mutations in chromosome 12 have been identified in around 65% of lipoma cases. Lipomas have also been shown to be increased in those with obesity, hyperlipidemia, and diabetes mellitus.

Lipomas are usually diagnosed clinically, although imaging (ultrasound, computed tomography, or magnetic resonance imaging) may be utilized to assist with the diagnosis of lipomas in atypical locations. The main treatment for lipomas is surgical excision, after which the tumor is examined with histopathology to confirm the diagnosis. The prognosis for benign lipomas is excellent and recurrence after excision is rare, but may occur if the removal was incomplete.

== Mechanism ==
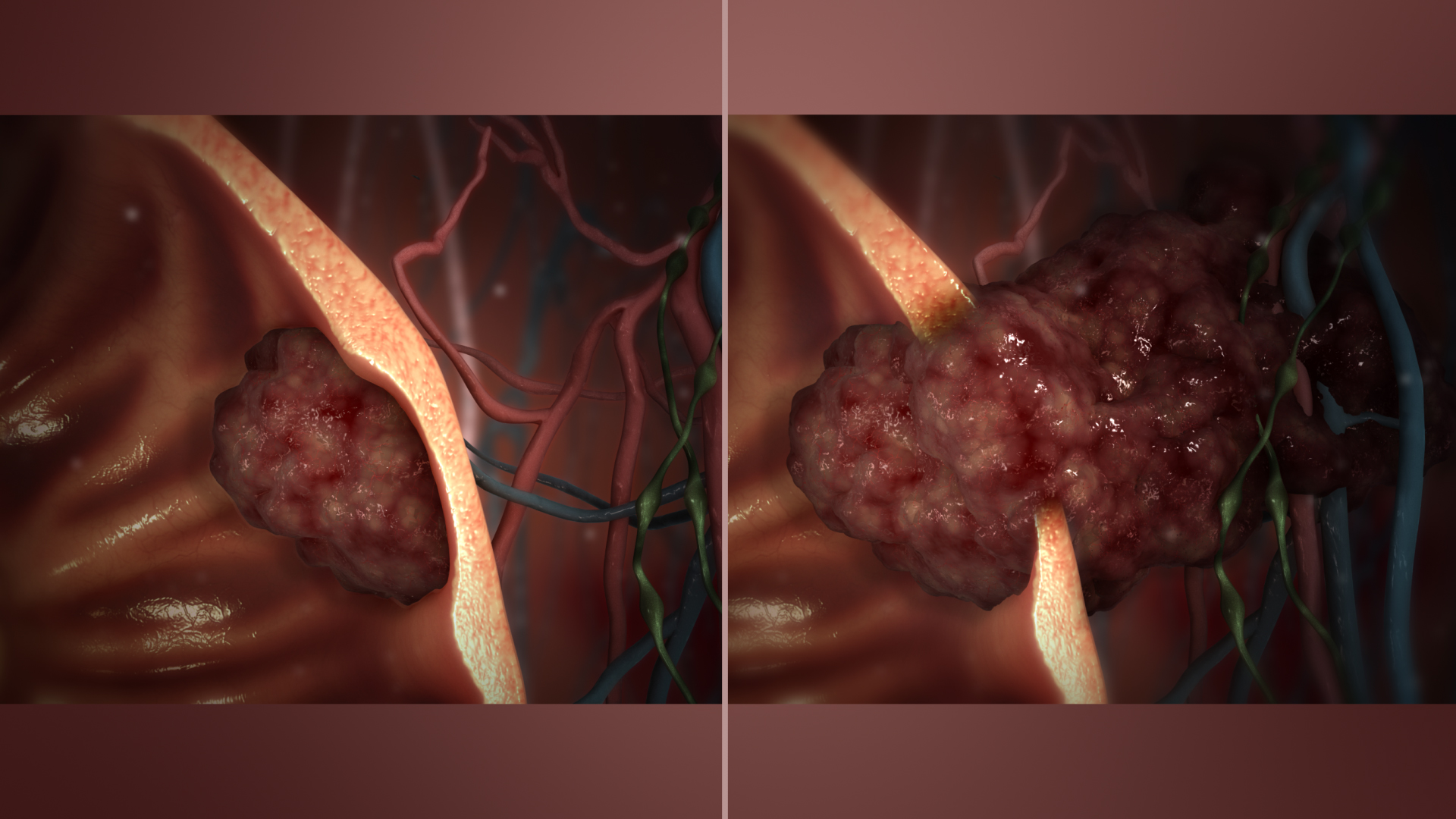
Benign (L) vs Malignant tumor (R)

=== Benign vs malignant ===
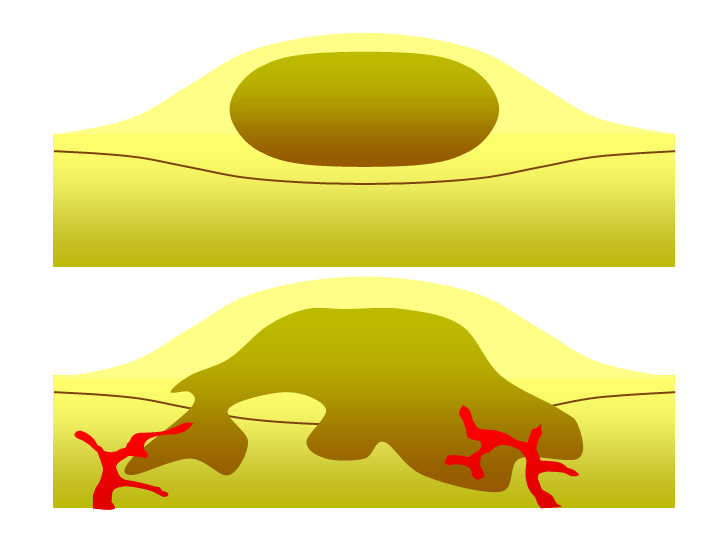
Diagram showing two epithelial tumors. The upper tumor is a benign tumor that is non-invasive. Benign tumors are usually round in shape and encapsulated by fibrous connective tissue. The lower picture depicts a malignant tumor. It is irregularly shaped, vascular, and it is invasive, crossing the basement membrane.

A tumor is classified as either benign or malignant based on its invasive potential. Benign tumors are non-invasive: They cannot invade adjacent tissues or metastasize (spread via metastasis). In contrast, malignant tumors are invasive or metastatic. For this reason, benign tumors are not classed as cancer. A benign tumor will grow in a contained area, usually a fibrous connective tissue capsule.

The growth rates of benign and malignant tumors usually differ, with benign tumors growing more slowly than malignant tumors. However, cases of fast-growing benign tumors have been documented. Although benign tumors generally pose a lower health risk than malignant tumors, both can be life-threatening.

Benign and malignant tumors differ in some general characteristics, but sometimes a benign tumor will exhibit some characteristics of a malignant tumor, or vice versa. For example, benign tumors are mostly well-differentiated, and malignant tumors are often undifferentiated. However, undifferentiated benign tumors can occur, as can differentiated malignant tumors. Certain malignant tumors, such as basal-cell carcinomas, are mostly non-metastatic.

=== Multistage carcinogenesis ===
Tumors are formed by carcinogenesis, a process in which cellular alterations lead to the formation of cancer. Multistage carcinogenesis involves the sequential genetic or epigenetic changes to a cell's DNA, where each step produces a more advanced tumor. It consists of three stages: initiation, promotion and progression. Multiple mutations may occur per stage.

Initiation is where the first genetic mutation occurs in a cell. Promotion is the clonal expansion (repeated division) of this transformed cell into a visible tumor that is usually benign. Following promotion, progression may take place where more genetic mutations are acquired in a sub-population of tumor cells. Progression changes the benign tumor into a malignant tumor.

A prominent and well studied example of this phenomenon is the tubular adenoma, a common type of colon polyp which is an important precursor to colon cancer. The cells in tubular adenomas, like most tumors that frequently progress to cancer, show certain abnormalities of cell maturation and appearance collectively known as dysplasia. These cellular abnormalities are not seen in benign tumors that rarely or never turn cancerous, but are seen in other pre-cancerous tissue abnormalities which do not form discrete masses, such as pre-cancerous lesions of the uterine cervix.

== Diagnosis ==
=== Classification ===
Tumors and cell origin
Cell origin	Cell type	Tumor
Endodermal	Biliary tree	Cholangioma
Endodermal	Colon	Colonic polyp
Endodermal	Glandular	Adenoma
Endodermal	Glandular	Papilloma
Endodermal	Glandular	Cystadenoma
Endodermal	Liver	Liver cell adenoma
Endodermal	Placental	Hydatiform mole
Endodermal	Renal	Renal tubular adenoma
Endodermal	Squamous	Squamous cell papilloma
Endodermal	Stomach	Gastric polyp
Mesenchymal	Blood vessel	Hemangioma, Cardiac myxoma
Mesenchymal	Bone	Osteoma
Mesenchymal	Cartilage	Chondroma
Mesenchymal	Fat tissue	Lipoma
Mesenchymal	Fibrous tissue	Fibroma
Mesenchymal	Lymphatic vessel	Lymphangioma
Mesenchymal	Smooth muscle	Leiomyoma
Mesenchymal	Striated muscle	Rhabdomyoma
Ectodermal	Glia	Astrocytoma, Schwannoma
Ectodermal	Melanocytes	Nevus
Ectodermal	Meninges	Meningioma
Ectodermal	Nerve cells	Ganglioneuroma

Benign neoplasms are typically, but not always, composed of cells which bear a strong resemblance to a normal cell type in their organ of origin. These tumors are named for the cell or tissue type from which they originate. The suffix "-oma" (but not -carcinoma, -sarcoma, or -blastoma, which are generally cancers) is applied to indicate a benign tumor. For example, a lipoma is a common benign tumor of fat cells (lipocytes), and a chondroma is a benign tumor of cartilage-forming cells (chondrocytes). Adenomas are benign tumors of gland-forming cells, and are usually specified further by their cell or organ of origin, as in hepatic adenoma (a benign tumor of hepatocytes, or liver cells). Teratomas contain many cell types such as skin, nerve, brain and thyroid, among others, because they are derived from germ cells. Hamartomas are a group of benign tumors that have relatively normal cellular differentiation but exhibit disorganized tissue organization.

Exceptions to the nomenclature rules exist for historical reasons. Malignant examples include melanoma (a skin cancer of pigmented melanocytes) and seminoma (a cancer of male reproductive cells).

Not all benign growths are tumors. Skin tags, vocal chord polyps, and hyperplastic polyps of the colon are often called benign, but they are overgrowths of normal tissue rather than neoplasms.

=== Imaging ===
Radiography can be used to image a tumor and determine whether it is malignant. Smaller tumors are more likely benign. For example, regarding lung cancer, 80% of lung nodules less than 2 cm in diameter are benign. Most benign nodules are smoothed radiopaque densities with clear margins, but these are not exclusive signs of benign tumors.

== Treatment ==
Benign tumors typically need no treatment unless they cause problems such as seizures, discomfort or cosmetic concerns. Surgery is usually the most effective approach and is used to treat most benign tumors. In some cases, other treatments may be used. Adenomas of the rectum may be treated with sclerotherapy, in which chemicals are used to shrink blood vessels in order to cut off the blood supply. Most benign tumors do not respond to chemotherapy or radiation therapy, although there are exceptions; benign intercranial tumors are sometimes treated with radiation therapy and chemotherapy under certain circumstances. Radiation can also be used to treat hemangiomas in the rectum. Benign skin tumors are usually surgically resected but other treatments such as cryotherapy, curettage, electrodesiccation, laser therapy, dermabrasion, chemical peels and topical medication are used.
