= Hemangiomatosis =

Hemangiomatosis may refer to:

- Diffuse neonatal hemangiomatosis
- Benign neonatal hemangiomatosis
