= List of Chihayafuru episodes =

Chihayafuru is an anime series adapted from the manga of the same title by Yuki Suetsugu, produced by Madhouse and directed by Morio Asaka, with Kunihiko Hamada designing the characters and Kousuke Yamashita composing the music. The story follows Chihaya Ayase, a girl who is inspired by a classmate to take up competitive karuta, with the dream of forming a club and reaching the national tournament. The series aired on Nippon Television between 4 October 2011, and 27 March 2012, (Note: As Chihayafuru's first season aired in Nippon Television's Tuesday 25:59 (1:59 JST) time slot, the episodes technically aired the days following the ones listed.) and was also simulcast by Crunchyroll. The opening theme is "Youthful", performed by 99RadioService, and the ending theme is "Soshite Ima" (そしていま), performed by Asami Seto. The series was released in 9 volumes on DVD and Blu-ray Disc between 21 December 2011, and 22 August 2012, and as a complete set on Blu-ray Disc on 18 July 2013. Animax Asia aired their English adaptation of the first series from 13 February to 18 March 2013. A second season, Chihayafuru 2, aired in Japan between 11 January and 28 June 2013, (Note: As Chihayafuru's second season aired in Nippon Television's Friday 25:53 (1:53 JST) time slot, the episodes technically aired the days following the ones listed.) and was also simulcast by Crunchyroll. The opening theme is "Star" by 99RadioService whilst the ending theme is "Akane Sora" (茜空) by Seto. Episode 26 did not air on television and instead was released as an original animation DVD on 13 September 2013, together with the limited edition of the 22nd volume of the manga. The third season aired from 22 October 2019, to 24 March 2020. The third season's opening and ending themes are "Colorful" by 99RadioService and "Hitomebore" (一目惚れ; "Love at First Sight") by Band Harassment.

== Series overview ==
Series	Episodes	Originally released	
Series	Episodes	First released	Last released
1	25	4 October 2011	27 March 2012
2	26	11 January 2013	13 September 2013
3	24	22 October 2019	24 March 2020

== Episodes ==
=== Chihayafuru (2011) ===
No.	Title	Directed by	Written by	Original release date	English air date
1	"Now the Flower Blooms"; Transliteration: "Saku ya kono hana" (Japanese: さくやこのはな)	Morio Asaka	Yūko Kakihara	4 October 2011	13 February 2013
First-year Mizusawa high school student Chihaya Ayase tries to form a karuta club, but no one takes the club seriously. When she is reunited with Taichi Mashima, her friend from East Ōsato elementary school, she remembers when she met Arata Wataya in sixth grade. In an extended flashback, the other elementary school students, led by Taichi, make fun of Arata and his Fukui accent. Chihaya stands up for Arata and discovers his amazing proficiency at competitive karuta. He tells her that his dream is to become a karuta master, the top-ranked male player.
2	"The Red That Is"; Transliteration: "Kara kurenai ni" (Japanese: からくれなゐに)	Yoshitaka Makino	Ayako Katō	11 October 2011	14 February 2013
In the annual elementary school karuta tournament, the final match is between Taichi and Arata. Feeling threatened by Arata's skill, Taichi steals Arata's glasses before the match. Chihaya substitutes for Arata and defeats Taichi. Her mother and her older sister, Chitose, a beauty pageant contestant and aspiring model, are indifferent to the accomplishment, because a talent scout is recruiting Chitose. Taichi's mother scolds him for losing and tells him to attempt only things at which he is guaranteed to win, but Chihaya tells him there is nothing wrong with losing a fair fight. When Taichi returns Arata's glasses and admits to stealing them, he asks Arata not to tell Chihaya, because he doesn't want her to hate him. Arata calls him a coward for stealing the glasses, but he says he understands why Taichi doesn't want Chihaya to hate him.
3	"From the Crystal White Snow"; Transliteration: "Fureru shirayuki" (Japanese: ふれるしらゆき)	Kotono Watanabe	Yūko Kakihara	18 October 2011	15 February 2013
Chihaya, Arata, and Taichi visit a Shiranami Karuta Society practice session. There they meet Dr. Harada, the society's director, and the oddball Hiro Kinashi, known as Retro (ひょろ, Hyoro), a sixth-grader like them. Chihaya, Arata, and Taichi play Retro and his friends in a three-on-three Genpei match. Taichi tells Arata he should just play alone against Retro and his friends, but Arata says he wants to play as a team. At Chihaya's urging, they decide to compete in an upcoming tournament for teams of three. In the meantime, Taichi is accepted into a prestigious middle school, and Arata learns he will move back to Fukui when the school year is over, meaning the trio's brief karuta partnership will have to come to an end. Chihaya is heartbroken at this devastating news. In the tournament, Chihaya is matched against Yūsei Nishida, whom she quickly nicknames Porky (肉まん, Nikuman), in the first round and loses. Taichi also loses his match, so the team is eliminated. After the last day of school, Chihaya says that, as long as they have karuta, they will see each other again.
4	"A Whirlwind of Flower Petals Descends"; Transliteration: "Shizu-gokoro naku hana no chiruran" (Japanese: しつこころなくはなのちるらむ)	Tomokazu Tokoro	Ayako Katō	25 October 2011	18 February 2013
As Chihaya and Taichi say good-bye to Arata, Chihaya declares she will become a karuta queen, the top-ranked female player, and Taichi declares he will become a master. Back in the present, Chihaya tells Taichi that she made Class B over spring break and that, if she wins a tournament that Sunday and makes Class A, he has to help her form a karuta club at school. When Taichi goes to watch Chihaya play, Harada recognizes him immediately. Taichi tells him that he played karuta in middle school with a club, but it is no longer his dream to become a master. Harada tells him that Chihaya never gave up on karuta, often playing karuta alone in middle school, even though she joined the track team. Chihaya wins and makes Class A. When Chihaya calls Arata to tell him, the first time they have talked since elementary school, he tells her not to call anymore, because he has stopped playing karuta.
5	"The Sight of a Midnight Moon"; Transliteration: "Yowa no tsuki kana" (Japanese: よはのつきかな)	Naoyuki Itō	Akemi Moriyama	1 November 2011	19 February 2013
Chihaya and Taichi travel to Fukui to see Arata. Once at his house, Arata tells them to leave. Chihaya takes out a deck of cards and tries to get him to play karuta, but Arata kicks the deck, scattering the cards. Taichi drags Chihaya away to leave. Yuu, the girl who lives next door to Arata, runs after them with the cards and tells them to take the cards away. She tells them Arata's grandfather died from a stroke on a day Arata was supposed to be nursing him but was instead at a tournament making Class A. Arata realizes he still wants to be Chihaya's friend and runs after her and Taichi, who see him as their train pulls away. Taichi tells Chihaya that he will help her to form a club and to wait for Arata's return to karuta.
6	"Now Bloom Inside the Nine-fold Palace"; Transliteration: "Kyō kokonoe ni nioi nuru kana" (Japanese: けふここのへににほひぬるかな)	Hideki Hosokawa	Sumino Kawashima	8 November 2011	20 February 2013
Chihaya has convinced Taeko Miyauchi, the science teacher and tennis coach, to allocate a storage room in one of the school's out-buildings as a clubroom. Kanade Ōe, who currently belongs to the archery club so she can wear a hakama, considers joining the karuta club instead, because she thinks they love the classical poems and also wear hakama. She is shocked that competitive karuta is not the refined love of poetry that she thought it was. She is further disappointed that the karuta club does not wear hakama. Chihaya is determined to recruit Kana, nevertheless, and visits her at the traditional clothing store that her family owns. When Chihaya learns that the poems have symbolic meanings and rich historical contexts, she asks Kana to explain all 100 of them. Kana agrees to join the club on the condition that Chihaya models kimonos for the store's catalog and that the club members wear hakama for tournaments.
7	"But For Autumn's Coming"; Transliteration: "Hito koso miene aki wa ki ni keri" (Japanese: ひとこそみえねあきはきにけり)	Kazuo Nogami	Ayako Katō	15 November 2011	21 February 2013
Taichi assesses his karuta skills. His advantages are memorization and adaptation based on what cards have been read. Chihaya has enough speed, however, to take cards even if Taichi reacts first. Chihaya attempts to recruit the second-ranked first-year student, Tsutomu Komano, nicknamed Desk-tomu (机くん, Tsukue-kun) by his classmates because he is always studying. Komano is not interested. When Chihaya says that players memorize the positions of all the cards, he does not believe her, but he pauses when he realizes that Taichi, the first-ranked first-year student, is in the club. He challenges Chihaya and Taichi to play a game with the cards turned over. Taichi has the advantage with better memorization and wins. After the match, Komano still leaves, saying he has no talent for karuta. Taichi says he also has no talent and keeps losing, but he would rather have someone who works hard and loses than someone who just has talent. Komano decides to join the karuta club.
8	"The Sounds of the Waterfall"; Transliteration: "Taete hisashiku narinuredo" (Japanese: たえてひさしくなりぬれど)	Fumihiro Yoshimura	Satoshi Suzuki	22 November 2011	22 February 2013
At school, Chihaya encounters Nishida, who refuses to join the karuta club because he is now in the tennis club. Chihaya realizes that he is using karuta timing to play tennis and tells him that that is not fair to tennis. Nishida thinks the karuta club is at an elementary school level, so Taichi challenges him to play Chihaya. As Nishida plays, he remembers how much he enjoyed karuta. Although Chihaya wins, Nishida insists that he is still not coming back to karuta, because he can never be as good as Arata. Miyauchi passes the clubroom and sees Nishida there. When she demands that he explain why he was skipping tennis practice, he realizes he still loves karuta and decides to quit the tennis club to join the karuta club. As Chihaya draws up the list of members to request official recognition for the club, she rejoices that she is no longer alone.
9	"But I Cannot Hide"; Transliteration: "Shinoburedo" (Japanese: しのぶれど)	Yoshitaka Makino	Akemi Moriyama	29 November 2011	25 February 2013
Miyauchi grants the club official status, with herself as provisional advisor, if the members select someone other than Chihaya as president. When the other members select Taichi, Chihaya declares herself captain. Chihaya sets a goal of winning the Tokyo regional high school team tournament, so the club decides to hold a camp at Taichi's house over a long holiday weekend while his family is away. Chihaya sets an exhausting schedule, especially for Kana and Komano. When Taichi's mother and younger sister come home early, Chihaya and Kana hide, then go to Chihaya's house to sleep. At midnight Kana drags Chihaya to a park where the guys are waiting for a surprise birthday party for Chihaya. Chihya apologizes for the hard practice, but the others thank her for helping them improve. Arata texts Taichi a happy birthday wish to relay to Chihaya. Chihaya decides it is the best birthday ever.
10	"Exchange Hellos and Goodbyes"; Transliteration: "Yuku mo kaeru mo wakarete wa" (Japanese: ゆくもかへるもわかれては)	Naoyuki Itō	Sumino Kawashima	6 December 2011	26 February 2013
Chihaya sends texts to Arata throughout the regional tournament, but he never responds. She asks Taichi why Arata only sends texts to him. Taichi says nothing, but thinks that it is because he and Arata think of Chihaya as belonging to both of them. Komano, frustrated that he cannot win any matches, declares that he is going home. Taichi allows him to skip the semi-finals, but orders him to compete in the finals. When Nishida says they should forget about Komano, Taichi faults everyone for not playing together as a team. The conflict affects Chihaya, and she plays poorly. In the meantime, Retro, who now attends Hokuō Academy, uses retrot (ひょろっと, hyorotto) tarot cards to divine what order Hokuō should use for the finals. Akito Sudō, the Hokuō captain, wants to toy with Chihaya if Mizusawa wins the semi-finals. Taichi realizes he has not been a good leader and encourages the team. Chihaya sees Komano, who has returned to support her, and recovers. Mizusawa wins and advances to the finals.
11	"The Sky is the Road Home"; Transliteration: "Ama tsu kaze" (Japanese: あまつかぜ)	Kotono Watanabe	Ayako Katō	13 December 2011	27 February 2013
Harada and Hiroshi Tsuboguchi, the Shiranami ace, go to cheer for Chihaya and Taichi. Chihaya suggests an order that brings out the best in themselves rather than worrying about Hokuō's order. Using Retro's cards, Hokuō matches Sudō against Chihaya, Retro against Taichi, and the rest randomly, since they are confident of an easy win. Mochida, the Hokuō coach, warns them they may be over-confident. Arata finally checks his email and sees all the texts from Chihaya. When Mochida tells Harada that the tournament has only one reader, Harada realizes Chihaya has an advantage, because she has already learned the reader's quirks. Kana and Komano lose their matches. Taichi defeats Retro, and Nishida defeats Nayuta Amakasu. Sudō, unable to pull ahead of Chihaya, reflects that Mochida taught him that karuta is fun, even if the match is going poorly. Chihaya defeats Sudō. Chihaya sends Arata a picture of the team and says he should come to watch them at the nationals at Ōmi Jingū.
12	"Sets These Forbidden Fields Aglow"; Transliteration: "Murasaki no yuki shime no yuki" (Japanese: むらさきのゆきしめのゆき)	Tomoaki Ōta	Sumino Kawashima	20 December 2011	28 February 2013
At home, Chihaya tries to tell her parents about the tournament, but they are preoccupied with Chitose's appearance on a quiz show. At school, Miyauchi minimizes the importance of karuta and says another teacher will accompany the club to Ōmi Jingū. When Chihaya loses a game to Harada at the Shirinami Society, she feels the pressure of representing Tokyo at the nationals, but Taichi tells her that Retro gave him all of Hokuō's intelligence on their competitors. Chihaya returns home and is touched when she finds that her father has started a scrapbook of clippings of her accomplishments. At the end of a day, Miyauchi passes by the clubroom and realizes karuta is not as trivial as she had thought it was. She decides to learn about karuta and to accompany the club to Ōmi Jingū.
13	"For You, I Head Out"; Transliteration: "Kimi ga tame" (Japanese: きみがため)	Jun Shishido	Akemi Moriyama	3 January 2012	1 March 2013
In the first round of the national tournament, Chihaya has alternating sweats and chills. Meanwhile, Arata makes his way there and thinks of his grandfather, who continued to coach him even after he had suffered a stroke. After a subsequent stroke, he lost lucidity and even forgot what karuta was. On the day of a tournament when Arata was nursing him alone, he regained his lucidity and commanded Arata to compete. As Arata won and made Class A, his grandfather suffered another stroke and died. Arata arrives at Ōmi Jingū just as Chihaya passes out. The team forfeits Chihaya's match, but continues the round. Praised by one of the officials who thinks he is there to compete, Arata imagines telling his grandfather that he still loves karuta. Afterwards, the team tells Chihaya how Komano won two matches in a row and how they advanced to the playoffs before losing to Fujisaki.
14	"For There Is No One Else Out There"; Transliteration: "Hana yori hoka ni shiru hito mo nashi" (Japanese: はなよりほかにしるひともなし)	Hideki Hosokawa	Satoshi Suzuki	10 January 2012	4 March 2013
The next day is the individual tournament. Taichi thinks about how he needs to be in Class A to play Arata in a match. Sudō tells Chihaya that Shinobu Wakamiya, the youngest karuta queen in history and a first-year high school student, is playing Amakasu in the first round. Shinobu defeats him by 24 cards. Chihaya faces her in the second round. Taichi gets a bye in the Class B tournament and goes to watch their match. He sees that Chihaya reacts first, but Shinobu is faster and moves more accurately to take all the cards. As Chihaya falls behind, she stops playing aggressively. Shinobu is disappointed that Chihaya has given up already. Chihaya remembers not being able to take any cards against Arata and resolves not to be weaker now than she was then. Chihaya starts taking cards.
15	"As Though Pearls Have Been Strung Across the Autumn Plain"; Transliteration: "Tsuranuki tomenu tama zo chiri keru" (Japanese: つらぬきとめぬたまぞちりける)	Yūta Takamura	Yūko Kakihara	17 January 2012	5 March 2013
Shinobu defeats Chihaya by 20 cards and resolves not to let Chihaya take any cards if they ever meet again, but she is disarmed when Chihaya compliments her Snowmaru t-shirt. Chihaya resolves to improve her accuracy. Eventually Shinobu defeats Sudō in the Class A final. Chihaya goes to watch Taichi in the Class B final, where his fatigue and lack of physical speed lead to his loss. After reflecting on their weaknesses in the tournament, Taichi says the one thing everyone in the club lacks is stamina. They use the rest of the summer to train physically. Arata visits Kuriyama, the Fukui Nagumo Karuta Society director, and asks to join the society. Shinobu trains alone.
16	"The Autumn Leaves of Mount Ogura"; Transliteration: "Ogurayama" (Japanese: をぐらやま)	Kotono Watanabe	Naoya Takayama	24 January 2012	6 March 2013
A recap of the events so far, interspersed with various omake segments.
17	"World Offers No Escape"; Transliteration: "Michi koso nakere" (Japanese: みちこそなけれ)	Kazuo Nogami	Sumino Kawashima	31 January 2012	7 March 2013
Taichi researches the schedule of upcoming karuta tournaments so the club can use them to meet their individual goals. Chihaya needs to train for the eastern queen qualifier. Taichi and Nishida need to make Class A. Taichi also secretly desires to compete in the eastern master qualifier. Komano and Kana need to make Class C. Komano reflects on how much happier he is since joining the club. Taichi frequently travels to tournaments to try to make Class A, discovering Nishida and Retro are also at many of them for the same purpose. None of them succeed. Meanwhile, Harada tells Chihaya to stop relying on her speed. Komano explains the statistics he keeps and how he uses them to form strategies. Kana points out that Chihaya's reliance on sound and speed leads to a lot of faults, but Kana differentiates poems by meanings, so she commits fewer faults.
18	"The Plum Blossoms Still Smell the Same"; Transliteration: "Hana zo mukashi no ka ni nioi keru" (Japanese: はなぞむかしのかににほひける)	Fumio Maezono	Ayako Katō	7 February 2012	8 March 2013
The club members compete in a regular individual tournament. Chihaya tries to play a balanced style that doesn't rely on speed, but she is unable to restrain herself and commits a lot of faults. She also recognizes that her opponent, Sakura Kanai, is using the strategy against her that Komano described. She loses the match, but learns from watching Kanai that what she lacks is timing. Afterwards, she and Retro watch the Class B final between Taichi and Nishda and the Class D final between Komano and Kana. Chihaya realizes that she should watch them to learn from them rather than to support them. She is drawn to the match between Komano and Kana.
19	"As the Years Pass"; Transliteration: "Nagaraeba" (Japanese: ながらへば)	Naoyuki Itō	Akemi Moriyama	14 February 2012	11 March 2013
Chihaya reflects that faults are costing Komano his match against Kana, just like her faults cost her the match against Kanai earlier. Komano realizes he isn't losing to Kana so much as to himself. Kana defeats Komano, and both make Class C. When the match between Taichi and Nishida comes down to luck of the draw, Taichi tries to increase his chances of winning by trying to push Nishida into a fault, but he fails. Nishida defeats Taichi and makes Class A. On the way home, everyone comments that the team is much stronger now. Chihaya expresses her desire to play as a team again. When Arata sees Taichi's and Nishida's rank in the results of the tournament, he decides to enter the western master qualifier.
20	"The Cresting Waves Almost Look Like Clouds in the Skies"; Transliteration: "Kumoi ni magō okitsu shiranami" (Japanese: くもゐにまがふおきつしらなみ)	Atsuko Ishizuka	Satoshi Suzuki	21 February 2012	12 March 2013
Komano tutors Chihaya and Nishida for exams while Taichi enters a tournament, his last opportunity to make Class A before the eastern master qualifier. Arata, also there, gives him a note with his contact details to give to Chihaya. Chihaya ditches studying, but arrives after Taichi loses. She watches Arata, who loses to Tsuboguchi. Taichi gives him the note back, saying Arata should give Chihaya his information himself. Arata responds that he wasn't sure if Taichi and Chihaya were a couple or not. As Kana drags Chihaya back to studying, Chihaya laments that she only gets to see Arata at tournaments. On the way home, Harada offers Taichi a promotion to Class A, even though it would break a Shiranami rule. Taichi declines, saying he wants to focus on becoming a person who doesn't run away.
21	"As My Sleeves Are Wet With Dew"; Transliteration: "Waga koromode ni yuki wa furi tsutsu" (Japanese: わがころもでにゆきはふりつつ)	Tomoaki Ōta	Yūko Kakihara	28 February 2012	13 March 2013
Nishida points out that Taichi's strength and weakness is seeing karuta only as a mental contest. He says Taichi needs to start taking practice swings, so he can learn the distance to the cards. At the eastern qualifier, Sudō tells Chihaya that colleges give scholarships to students who place first or second in national tournaments. Chihaya inadvertently bets Sudō that the first one of them to lose must shave their head. In the first round, Chihaya faces Ririka Tachikawa, a child prodigy hailed as the next Shinobu. Chihaya focuses on timing before switching back to speed and winning the round. Harada tells Tsuboguchi that he wants Chihaya to have more weapons than just her talent. At the western qualifier, Shinichi Murao, Arata's usual karuta partner, loses in the first round and tells Arata that no one can beat Hisashi Suō, the current master, anyway. Taichi texts Arata saying that Chihaya won the first round and that he expects Arata to be the western finalist.
22	"Just as My Beauty Has Faded"; Transliteration: "Utsuri ni keri na itazura ni" (Japanese: うつりにけりないたづらに)	Hideki Hosokawa	Sumino Kawashima	6 March 2012	14 March 2013
In the second round, Chihaya faces the former queen, Yumi Yamamoto, who lost the title to Shinobu a year ago. Yumi has a history of contesting every card she loses, but this year she is unenthusiastic. Watching through the window, Kana is impressed with the clear voice of the reader. As Chihaya dominates the match, Kitano, the Suihoku Karuta Society director, forces open the window and tells Yumi to play her own karuta. She contests cards, which Chihaya is unprepared to handle, and defeats Chihaya.
23	"The Night is Nearly Past"; Transliteration: "Shiroki o mireba yo zo fuke ni keru" (Japanese: しろきをみればよぞふけにける)	Kazuo Nogami	Satoshi Suzuki	13 March 2012	15 March 2013
Depressed by her loss, Chihaya hides inside a locker. Harada takes up the defense of Chihaya's hair against Sudō. When Taichi says she needs to come out to cheer for Harada, she comes out but says Taichi needs to watch them because they will be his rivals when he makes Class A. Harada defeats Sudō, but loses in the semi-finals. Tsuboguchi and Yumi become the eastern finalists. Arata loses in the fourth round of the western qualifier. Arata tries to convince Murao to come back to karuta to help him train to become master. Murao says the point of karuta isn't to become master, but he'll play sometime if Arata wants to have fun. Tsuboguchi loses the master challenger match. Yumi wins the queen challenger match. On Christmas Eve, the club members attend parties held by their respective classes. Taichi has given Arata's cell number to Chihaya, so following her party, she calls Arata.
24	"Nobody Wishes to See the Beautiful Cherry Blossoms"; Transliteration: "Onoe no sakura saki ni keri" (Japanese: をのへのさくらさきにけり)	migmi	Naoya Takayama	20 March 2012	18 March 2013
The club members watch the master and queen matches on TV at Taichi's house. They are shocked to see that Shinobu is now pudgy, she ate too much ice cream to win limited-time Snowmaru items, which affects her speed and accuracy. Shinobu, wearing her grandmother's kimono, remembers when her mother divorced her father. She and her mother went to live with her grandmother, who took Shinobu to the Myojo Karuta Society when Shinobu became interested in karuta. As Yumi takes several cards in a row, Shinobu apologizes to them in her mind that she wasn't able to save them. She remembers how her classmates in elementary school stole her cards and hid them. Shinobu defeats Yumi and retains her title. Chihaya realizes she needs to become attached to the cards the way Shinobu and Kana are. Attention shifts to the master match. Nishida tells Chihaya her style is more like Suō's than Shinobu's. The commentator recounts that Suō said that he has 28 one-syllable cards.
25	"Moonlight, Clear and Bright"; Transliteration: "More izuru tsuki no kage no sayakesa" (Japanese: もれいづるつきのかげのさやけさ)	Hideki Hosokawa; Morio Asaka	Naoya Takayama	27 March 2012	19 March 2013
Suō reflects that other players may not appreciate how Kyoko Yamashiro, the reader for the match, loves the Japanese language. Watching on TV, Murao thinks about how he has left Arata alone. Arata, also watching on TV, visualizes playing Suō, but knows that he needs to play strong opponents. Suō wins and retains his title. Ise, the Myojo director, invites Shinobu to visit the society, but she politely declines. Komano amazes Chihaya by using his statistics to figure out that she has 20 one-syllable cards. Discouraged that he doesn't have talent like Chihaya and Suō, Taichi calls Arata, who tells him that his grandfather once said that there are plenty of ways to take cards that don't rely on talent. Murao helps Arata train. Kana decides her dream is to become a certified reader, but is daunted when she learns she must first be Class A. Taichi begins training with practice swings. As the new school year begins, the faculty decides to turn over the clubroom to the concert band if the karuta club cannot recruit at least five new members.

=== Chihayafuru 2 (2013) ===
No. overall	No. in season	Title	Directed by	Written by	Original release date
26	1	"So The Flower Has Wilted"; Transliteration: "Hana no iro wa" (Japanese: はなのいろは)	Tomomi Muraoka	Yūko Kakihara	11 January 2013
New first-year student Sumire Hanano, who is dumped by her boyfriend on the first day of school, takes an interest in Taichi as the karuta club appeals for new members. Twenty first-years, Sumire included, apply to join the club, although most are inexperienced and intimidated by the effort the game requires. Chihaya soon realizes the club members all have different priorities for the club. Chihaya's priority is to make the club stronger, by Taichi making Class A and by Chihaya training the new members, so the club can win the national high school tournament, both team and individual in every class. Sumire tails Taichi as he goes to train at the Shiranami society.
27	2	"As My Love First Came"; Transliteration: "Koisu chō" (Japanese: こひすてふ)	Masaharu Tomoda	Ayako Katō	18 January 2013
At the Shiranami Society, Taichi plays Tsuboguchi, who has graduated from college and is now a high school teacher. Harada catches Sumire spying on the players through the door. At the next meeting, nearly all of the applicants leave the club. Only a boy named Akihiro Tsukuba remains, but Sumire returns when she becomes bored with her new friends. During practice, Tsukuba expresses an inflated opinion of his karuta skills. Chihaya urges Sumire to clip her nails, because she will start moving faster to take cards, but Sumire blurts that she is only in the club to pursue Taichi. Embarrassed, she runs away. When Chihaya says she always wonders what would have happened if the team had someone to substitute for her when she collapsed the previous year, Nishida takes training the new members seriously. Kana catches up to Sumire and brings her back to the clubroom. Sumire realizes that pursuing Taichi means getting better at karuta, so she clips her nails.
28	3	"Feel Love Deepen"; Transliteration: "Tsukuba ne no" (Japanese: つくばねの)	Kazuo Nogami	Yūko Kakihara	25 January 2013
Murao and Arata place first and second, respectively, in a Fukui tournament. Arata states that his current goal is to compete in the national high school championship, not the master qualifier. Meanwhile, the Mizusawa club competes in the Tokyo regional team tournament. Taichi and Nishida learn that two schools get to advance to the national tournament from Tokyo this year. When Nishida catches Tsukuba attempting to replace Komano with himself in the line-up in order to impress his little brothers, Komano suggests they include Sumire in the first round and Tsukuba in the second round. Chihaya wins her matches in both rounds by 25 cards. Sumire is impressed that Chihaya was not belittled because she was a girl playing against boys. Ise telephones Shinobu to tell her that he will register her in the high school individual tournament and that Arata is going to compete as well.
29	4	"To Tell the People in the Capital That I Make for the Islands"; Transliteration: "Hito ni wa tsugeyo ama no tsuri bune" (Japanese: ひとにはつげよ あまのつりぶね)	Jun Shishido	Ayako Katō	1 February 2013
Harada and two women from the Shiranami Society go to watch the regional tournament. In the semi-final, Mizusawa is matched against Homei, whose advisor is Tsugobuchi. Tsuboguchi gives his team insight to get inside Taichi's head to distract him. Mochida points out to Harada that, unlike last year, the tournament is using a different reader every round this year. Taichi struggles against his opponent, making him think he lacks the skill to win. Miyauchi also goes to watch the tournament. The air conditioner over the Mizusawa match malfunctions. When Taichi asks for a towel, the Shiranami women, Miyauchi, Sumire, Kana, Kana's mother, and Chihaya all provide him with towels. Sumire realizes Chihaya watches Taichi as much as Taichi watches Chihaya. Sumire goes to scout the Hokuō match. Taichi recovers and wins the match. Mizusawa wins the round.
30	5	"Be As Dear Now, Those Were the Good Old Days"; Transliteration: "Nao amari aru mukashi nari keri" (Japanese: なほあまりある むかしなりけり)	Eiichi Kuboyama	Sumino Kawashima	8 February 2013
Nishida learns that his older sister has become Retro's girlfriend. Sumire reports that Amakasu plans to target Taichi, thinking that defeating Komano and Kana will be easy, to secure three wins for Hokuō with minimal effort. Nishida catches Tsukuba trying to substitute himself for Komano again. To the surprise of both sides, Retro arranges Hokuō's order to have a fair match. Sudō is the reader for the final, putting pressure on Hokuō to perform. Miyauchi brings Mizusawa some tasuki to help them move more easily in kimonos. Komano and Kana perform well against their opponents, but Chihaya, trying to focus more on accuracy than speed, struggles against Amakasu. Nishida loses his match. Chihaya switches to speed.
31	6	"To Set the Tatsuta River Ablaze"; Transliteration: "Tatsuta no kawa no nishiki nari keri" (Japanese: たつたのかはの にしきなりけり)	Tatsuma Namikawa	Akemi Moriyama	15 February 2013
Chihaya catches up to Amakasu. The four Mizusawa players all have matches that are luck of the draw, but Hokuō manages to split their cards guaranteeing two wins, for three wins overall. Chihaya and Taichi go on the attack to increase their chances of winning by trying to push their opponents into a fault. Taichi succeeds in pushing Retro into a fault, giving Mizusawa an even chance. For the final card, Chihaya and Amakasu touch the card on Amakasu's side at the same time, so Hokuō still wins. Amakasu tells Sudō that he only moved because he felt Chihaya move. Tsukuba, his brothers, and Sumire join the Shiranami Society. Chihaya texts Arata that the final was both the most fun match and the most frustrating loss.
32	7	"They All Exchange Hellos and Goodbyes at the Gates of Ōsaka"; Transliteration: "Shiru mo shiranu mo ōsaka no seki" (Japanese: しるもしらぬも あふさかのせき)	Hitomi Ezoe	Yūko Kakihara	22 February 2013
Unrelated to Chihaya's dejection about the karuta club's loss, Chitose decides to give up acting. After begging to keep the clubroom despite recruiting fewer than five new members, Chihaya allows the concert band to use the room above the clubroom as storage. Chihaya's mother buys Chihaya her own kimono and hakama to support Chihaya's karuta. Noticing Chihaya is enthusiastic about karuta again, Chitose calls her agent to arrange for more auditions. In the clubroom, Kana explains the difference between "swiftness" (千早振る, chihayaburu) and "frenzy" (荒振る, araburu) using imagery of a smooth and shaky spinning top. The concert band performs the school anthem for the karuta club as thanks for letting them use the second floor. At the hotel the night before the national team competition, Chihaya calls Arata, but Arata says he's not interested in team tournaments.
33	8	"Which Shines over Mount Mikasa"; Transliteration: "Mikasa no yama ni ideshi tsuki kamo" (Japanese: みかさのやまに いでしつきかも)	Toshikatsu Tokoro	Ayako Katō	1 March 2013
Komano and Taichi choose Tsukuba as a starter for the first round against Chiba International High School of Information Sciences, whose team members are all ethnically non-Japanese. Komano and Sumire gather intelligence on Fujisaki, last year's national team champion, and First Akashi Girls' School, including Megumu Ōsaka, last year's western queen finalist. When Taichi notices that the Chiba members are not using correct English and are, in fact, native Japanese, he calls them out on it. The Chiba team is also all beginners, so Mizusawa defeats Chiba easily. Despite their loss, the Chiba team says they learned a lot and promise to return a better team for next year's tournament. Meanwhile, as Arata arrives at Ōmi Jingū to watch Chihaya and Taichi, Shinobu intercepts him.
34	9	"My Only Thought"; Transliteration: "Wata no hara" (Japanese: わたのはら)	Kazuo Nogami	Sumino Kawashima	8 March 2013
Shinobu, back to her previous weight, believes Arata's extended absence from karuta means he can never again defeat her. She intends to see the Birdman Rally on Lake Biwa, expressing the opinion that teams are for those who don't love karuta. Komano and Sumire continue scouting opponents during the second round. Trying to find the right time to approach Chihaya, Arata hides when he sees Retro and Chihaya trash talking each other. Arata's friend Shoji Kawauchi, who attends Fukui West and whose team is short a member due to traffic delays, convinces Arata to substitute for them, so they can play at least one round. Although Arata makes sure his play doesn't affect the outcome, Kuriyama spots him, saying he may be barred from playing in the individual tournament, since substitution is against the rules. The Birdman Rally is rained out.
35	10	"Rain Takes Longer to Dry"; Transliteration: "Murasame no" (Japanese: むらさめの)	Kotono Watanabe	Akemi Moriyama	15 March 2013
As Mizusawa begins a match against Yamaguchi Mioka, a distinguished school, the tournament officials discuss what to do concerning Arata's violation. Although Chihaya is able to defend her cards, she struggles to attack her opponent's. All the Mioka members place their cards randomly and move them frequently. Shinobu, drenched from the rain, arrives back at Ōmi Jingū and learns of Arata's situation. She threatens to forfeit the tournament if the officials don't let him play. Except for Chihaya and Tsukuba, the other Mizusawa members do well against Mioka. As the number of cards remaining decreases, Chihaya improves. Mizusawa wins. Sumire tells the team about Shinobu telling the officials she wants to compete against someone from Fukui. Chihaya deduces that it was Arata. As the team considers including Komano in the next match, Nishida suggests they leave him out.
36	11	"I Feel As Though My Body is on Fire with Ibuki Mugwort"; Transliteration: "Sashimo shiraji na moyuru omoi o" (Japanese: さしもしらじな もゆるおもひを)	Eiichi Kuboyama	Atsuo Ishino	22 March 2013
Komano's easy agreement to skip the next round angers Nishida, who says Komano has lost the drive to compete and abruptly leaves to have lunch at the cafeteria. Chihaya recalls that Harada once told her that watching a match closely is more tiring than playing. The team decides to let Komano rest for a round. Mizusawa's next match is against Shoyo High School from Kyoto. As Mizusawa effectively uses the information Komano gathered, Chihaya reflects that his data is just as important as their skill. Mizusawa wins. Meanwhile, Arata is allowed to compete on the condition that he write an essay of apology and that he is forbidden to watch his friends from Tokyo in the team tournament. Mizusawa prepares for the semi-final match against Akashi using the data Sumire collected. Chihaya reluctantly agrees not to be matched against one of Akashi's Class A players, but Taichi sets their order for a straight match, including Chihaya against Megumu.
37	12	"The Only Sign of Summer"; Transliteration: "Misogi zo natsu no shirushi nari keru" (Japanese: みそぎぞなつの しるしなりける)	Masahiro Takada	Ayako Katō	29 March 2013
The semi-final round matches Mizusawa against Akashi and Hokuō against Fujisaki. Seeing Mizusawa and Hokuō, the officials think Arata's friends from Tokyo are Hokuō. Chihaya assesses Megumu's play compared to her play in the queen challenger match against Yumi the previous fall, concluding Megumu has improved. Sudō, who has arrived to support Hokuō, begins watching the match between Chihaya and Megumu. Chihaya struggles, but believes it is going to be a fun match.
38	13	"In My Dreams, I Creep Closer to You"; Transliteration: "Yume no kayoi ji hito me yoku ran" (Japanese: ゆめのかよひぢ ひとめよくらむ)	Hideki Hosokawa	Sumino Kawashima	5 April 2013
Chihaya continues to struggle against Megumu, who has no interest in becoming queen, even though she was the previous year's western finalist. Chihaya manages to take a few cards, including some of Megumu's favorites. Megumu realizes Chihaya wants to become queen, stiffening her resolve to defeat Chihaya. Soon everyone is watching the Mizusawa match. The Akashi coach reflects that the whole team has improved, because they want to help Megumu become queen. Focusing on accuracy, Chihaya begins to catch up.
39	14	"People Would Always Ask If I Was Pining for Someone"; Transliteration: "Mono ya omou to hito no tou made" (Japanese: ものやおもふと ひとのとふまで)	Yukihiko Asaki	Akemi Moriyama	12 April 2013
Arata hears about Mizusawa's progress from the late-arriving Fukui West team member and coach. Shinobu challenges Arata to a game, but he declines, stating it is a day for team matches. Meanwhile, not even Sudō notices that Fujisaki has defeated Hokuō. One of the officials wonders if Arata came to watch Mizusawa, not Hokuō. Keiko Yuube defeats Nishida, but Kana wins her match immediately afterward. Taichi wins his match, but Chihaya loses to Megumu. Komano's match comes down to luck of the draw. Komano wins by taking his opponent's card. Tsukuba, worried about Kana's stamina, asks to replace her in the final, but Miyauchi thinks he just wants attention. Kana asks him to substitute for her.
40	15	"No Matter Where I Stand"; Transliteration: "Tago no ura ni" (Japanese: たごのうらに)	Takuma Suzuki	Atsuo Ishino	19 April 2013
Kana reveals that she jammed her finger during the match, and it is painfully swollen. One of the officials tells Retro that Arata came to support Hokuō and is in a back room. Meanwhile, Midori Sakurazawa, the Fujisaki coach, removes one of third-year Class A players from the line-up and replaces him with Rion Yamashiro, a second-year Class B player who is Kyoko Yamashiro's granddaughter. Kyoko Yamashiro is the reader for the final. Chihaya is matched against Rion. Taichi is matched against Emuro Ryoga, the Fujisaki captain. Before play begins, Retro informs Arata of Mizusawa reaching the final. Shinobu laughs when Retro refers to the eventual team tournament winner as the best in Japan, but Arata asks her to watch the match. On her way there, she passes the Fujisaki team in the hall during memorization time. She is disgusted that they spend their time having fun away from the cards. The final round begins.
41	16	"Wait for the Emperor's Return"; Transliteration: "Miyuki matanan" (Japanese: みゆきまたなむ)	Jun Shishido	N/A	26 April 2013
Recap episode with omake segments.
42	17	"Gust of Wind"; Transliteration: "Fuku kara ni" (Japanese: ふくからに)	Hitomi Ezoe	Ayako Katō	3 May 2013
Fujisaki takes an early lead over Mizusawa, including Rion, who has game sense rivaling Chihaya's and familiarity with her grandmother's voice. Chihaya listens carefully to Kyoko's reading and begins to catch up, but she injures her index finger. When Chihaya sends a card and takes it, Shinobu remembers Chihaya doing the same thing to her the previous year. Noticing Chihaya fight through her pain, the others become more determined.
43	18	"My Fear is That You Will Forget"; Transliteration: "Wasureji no" (Japanese: わすれじの)	Eiichi Kuboyama	Sumino Kawashima	10 May 2013
Komano loses his match. While Chihaya endures the pain of her injury, she notices Shinobu watching and gives her teammates encouragement. As Shinobu begins to feel ill, she recalls Ise isolating her from the other children at the Myojo Society when she was little to make her strong. Listening outside, Arata reflects that it is teams that recruit and teach new players. Tsukuba also loses his match.
44	19	"I Do Not Know Where This Love Will Take Me"; Transliteration: "Yukue mo shiranu koi no michi kana" (Japanese: ゆくへもしらぬ こひのみちかな)	Yūsuke Onoda	Akemi Moriyama	17 May 2013
Taichi catches up to Emuro using Komano's data, even pushing Emuro into a fault. Chihaya wins her match against Rion. Taichi's and Nishida's matches come down to luck of the draw, but they manage to synchronize their cards, giving them a chance for two more wins. Taichi and Nishida attack the Fujisaki side while dead cards are read to try to increase their chances. Eventually, the card on the Mizusawa side is read. Mizusawa wins the tournament. When Chihaya steps out into the hall, she sees Arata and tells him that she has become the best in Japan without becoming queen, because the team played together, and that he should never say that he's not interested in teams.
45	20	"Of the Autumn Rice Field"; Transliteration: "Aki no ta no" (Japanese: あきのたの)	Kotono Watanabe	Ayako Katō	24 May 2013
After the team tournament award ceremony, Miyauchi takes Chihaya to a clinic to attend to her injury. Meanwhile, Arata tells Taichi that the only team for him is one with Chihaya and Taichi. He also says he will win the individual tournament and attend a college in Tokyo. The doctor tells Chihaya that she should refrain from intense activity with a weakened finger bone, although she is referred to a larger hospital for a better diagnosis. The next day, Nishida's sister gives the team t-shirts. Chihaya wants to wear them and to compete in the individual tournament, anyway. Chihaya's goal for the club is still to win every class. When Nishida asks her how she can play, Chihaya sees Shinobu and decides to use her left hand. Arata's parents spectate the Class A tournament. Chihaya, matched against Akashi's Yuube in the first round, finds she is unable to take any cards with her left hand.
46	21	"But Its Legacy Continues to Spread"; Transliteration: "Na koso nagarete nao kikoe kere" (Japanese: なこそながれて なほきこえけれ)	Toshikatsu Tokoro	Sumino Kawashima	31 May 2013
Arata and Shinobu effortlessly win their first matches. Chihaya, able to take cards from Yuube, but unable to defend her own, realizes her card placement is right-handed. She also realizes how a right-handed defense is weak against a left-handed player. She mirror reflects her card positions and wins the round, amazing Arata, although it requires much more concentration. In the second round, Nishida is matched against Arata. Arata's parents cheer silently for Nishida, because they want Arata to attend a local Fukui college. Arata defeats Nishida, but Nishida's technique and determination impress Arata. Chihaya also wins her match. For the third round, Chihaya is matched against Shinobu, so she decides to use her right hand and takes the splint off her finger.
47	22	"Long Last We Meet"; Transliteration: "Meguri aite" (Japanese: めぐりあひて)	Masahiro Takada	Akemi Moriyama	7 June 2013
When Sakurazawa sees the tape on Chihaya's finger, she is stunned to learn that Chihaya has been using her left hand. Shinobu mutters that Chihaya's Mizusawa t-shirt is lame, so Chihaya dazzles her with the Mommy Bear tanktop she has underneath. Shinobu then jokingly offers to play with her right hand to allow for Chihaya's injury, but Chihaya responds sharply that she should not joke about that. As Shinobu dominates the match, Chihaya takes the tape off her finger to move faster, but Shinobu still wins. Shinobu remembers playing a girl her own age when she was small and going easy on her, because she valued her friendship, prompting Ise to isolate her. Just as she is wondering how easy she should have gone on Chihaya, Chihaya thanks her for not going easy on her and says that they will play again in the queen match. Shinobu again promises herself that she will not let Chihaya take a single card. Meanwhile, in the Class B tournament, Taichi is crushing Retro.
48	23	"To See The Beautiful Cherry Blossoms"; Transliteration: "Onoe no sakura saki ni keri" (Japanese: をのへのさくら さきにけり)	Hideki Hosokawa	Atsuo Ishino	14 June 2013
In the Class A semi-finals, Arata easily defeats Emuro, and Shinobu easily defeats Megumu. Meanwhile Sakurazawa finds Chihaya sleeping in the hallway. The Class A final is between Arata and Shinobu. The Class B final is between Taichi and Rion in the same room where Komano is in the Class C final. Chihaya is torn between supporting Taichi and Komano or watching Arata and Shinobu. Taichi is dumbfounded when Chihaya comes to watch him play, but remembers that Chihaya cares most about having him make Class A. Shinobu begins the Class A final by taking all the cards, but Arata recalls how he used to beat her and catches up. Meanwhile, Taichi tries to win his final quickly so Chihaya can watch Arata and Shinobu, but realizes he cannot beat Rion with speed. Focusing on accuracy as if he were playing Chihaya, Taichi wins the Class B tournament and makes Class A.
49	24	"When I Must Hide..."; Transliteration: "Kaku to dani" (Japanese: かくとだに)	Eiichi Kuboyama	Ayako Katō	21 June 2013
The Class A final is packed with spectators, but Sakurazawa sneaks Chihaya and Taichi into the room through a side door. Arata has the lead over Shinobu, but Shinobu manages to close the gap between them by taking risks. Watching him play, Chihaya is reminded of Kana's image of a stable spinning top for "impassioned", a word used to describe gods. Murao wonders what brought Arata back to karuta, but reflects that Arata developed his level of skill through hard work and practice, not talent. Arata wins the Class A final. The spectators are not as stunned by Arata's win as much as by Shinobu's loss. Arata tells Shinobu that he is amazed she made it through the match with a fever. Shinobu reflects that she always wanted to play strong opponents who put up a fight.
50	25	"I Can Look Up and See the Snowy Cap of Mt. Fuji"; Transliteration: "Fuji no takane ni yuki wa furi tsutsu" (Japanese: ふじのたかねにゆきはふりつつ)	Morio Asaka; Kotono Watanabe	Sumino Kawashima	28 June 2013
Arata's parents face the reality that Arata will go to college in Tokyo. Meanwhile, Komano and Tsukuba have won the Class C and Class D tournaments. As they leave Ōmi Jingū, Sakurazawa offers to send Chihaya a video of the Class A final. Later, a hospital examination reveals Chihaya has enchondromatosis in her index finger, so she decides to undergo an operation. While hospitalized, Chihaya borrows Chitose's laptop to watch the DVD of the Class A final. She calls Arata, who tells her that, whenever he plays, he thinks back to the apartment in Tokyo when they used to play karuta together. Hearing that, she thinks about how she will always love karuta and Arata. She spends the next week recovering from her operation and doing her summer homework, writing poems. Reading the poems, Kana realizes Arata is Taichi's rival for Chihaya. Chihaya calls Sakurazawa, who invites the whole Mizusawa club to a Fujisaki karuta camp. Chihaya and Taichi go to the camp.
51	26	"During My Forlorn Years in This World (Note: In Episode 1 of the Crunchyroll simulcast of Chihayafuru 2, the full translation of poem 9 is "So the flower has wilted during the long spring rains, Just as my beauty has faded / During my forlorn years in this world.")" Transliteration: "Waga mi yo ni furu nagame seshi ma ni" (Japanese: わがみよにふるながめせしまに)	Hideki Hosokawa; Morio Asaka	Sumino Kawashima	13 September 2013 (OVA)
During the time Chihaya is in the hospital, the karuta club discusses what to do for the upcoming cultural festival. Attempting to use the opportunity to get closer to Taichi, Sumire suggests putting on a Heian era-themed play based on The Tale of Genji, with herself as the female lead and Taichi as Genji. Kana, however, seeing an opportunity to get Chihaya and Taichi together, suggests Chihaya for the female lead. Ultimately Sumire settles for all the other club members playing Genji's many lovers, including Nishida, Komano, and Tsukuba dressed in drag. The club spends the rest of their meager annual budget on two flats for the play, but a typhoon destroys them. Sumire and Chihaya end up doing a short karuta-themed comedy piece with Nishida as Genji on the proscenium without a set. Arata laments that he continues not to get any screen time.

=== Chihayafuru 3 (2019) ===
No. overall	No. in season	Title	Directed by	Written by	Original release date
52	1	"May it be that I find" Transliteration: "Natsu no yo wa" (Japanese: なつのよは)	Tōru Takahashi	Yūko Kakihara	22 October 2019
Chihaya and Taichi spend summer break at Fujisaki's karuta training camp, whose brutal training includes seven matches a day plus jogging and other exercises, using her left hand as some practice is better than none. Taichi works on his stretches at night, seeking to get better. The rest of the club go to training camps of their own. The last day has Chihaya play Rion three times, Rion having become determined to make sure her camp wins. Sakurazawa critiques Chihaya's form in the next match and tells her to take cards with grace, shocking the Fujisaki players as she's never given any of them personal advice mid-match before. Chihaya's last match is against Taichi, who defeats her. On the train ride home, Taichi promises to defeat her in an official match with her using her right hand, inspiring her fighting spirit.
53	2	"The hazed early dawn light comes not from the moon" Transliteration: "Asaborake ariake no tsuki to" (Japanese: あさぼらけありあけのつきと)	Akiko Nakano	Yūko Kakihara	29 October 2019
Seeking to play against Chihaya's team, Arata addresses his school during an assembly in an attempt to join a karuta club, getting some interest from the students. In Chihaya's class, the students are given a future plans questionnaire, which Chihaya doesn't know how to fill out. Horikawa, another student, tells her she went to Kyoto with her family to scout out the best places, as their class field trip will take place there. During club practice, the Karuta team members talk about their wishes to become better karuta players, everyone having become more competitive. They're interrupted by Miyauchi with a schedule that reveals the Master and Queen qualifiers are held at the same time as the school's class trip, which the students aren't allowed to miss, leaving Chihaya depressed. Later, the bandages on Chihaya's right hand are removed. Soon, the club heads to the Yoshino tournament, a "warm-up" for the Meijin and Queen qualifiers in two weeks as only Class A and B players can attend. Chihaya greets Arata, who compliments how she looks in the hakama, and she promises she'll win every match. Sudo taunts Chihaya over the promise and Taichi makes a bet with him (after telling Chihaya not to bet) that whoever loses first won't attend the Meijin qualifiers. Komano, despite boasting earlier to the club he would make Class A by winning Yoshino, is defeated in the first match. While upset at his own arrogance, he is cheered by Kana. Nishida is paired against Sudo and loses but having fought until the end, he tired out Sudo, which will make it easier for one of them to defeat him.
54	3	"But from the crystal white snow of Yoshino"; Transliteration: "Yoshino no sato ni" (Japanese: よしののさとに)	Nobuaki Nakanishi	Yūko Kakihara	29 October 2019
One of the competitors, Inokuma Haruka, is drawing massive attention. She held the title of queen for four consecutive years (defeating Sakurazawa four consecutive times) until giving it up on maternity leave and has just returned. Ayase wins her first two matches, stopping for lunch and sleep. Nishimura notices she isn't as bold in taking cards as she was before. During the break, Arata asks Taichi for advice in starting a karuta club, but Taichi is bothered, as teams are something he has in common with Chihaya Arata does not, and walks away coldly. In the 4th round, Chihaya is paired against the Meijin runner-up, Takemura, while Rion has to deal with Sudo. Takemura's especially aggressive swings give Chihaya trouble until she finally gets her balance with her right hand back, using grace instead of strength to take cards. When the Chihayafuru card is read, Chihaya and Inokuma's cards collide in mid-air, meaning they were taken at the same time. Rion presses Sudo hard despite her exhaustion and nearly defeats him before losing. Arata defeats Yumin, the Queen runner-up. Chihaya and Takashi also win their matches. They make it to the final eight, but Chihaya's next match is against Inokuma.
55	4	"Nobody wishes to see" Transliteration: "Takasago no" (Japanese: たかさごの)	Hideki Hosokawa	Yūko Kakihara	5 November 2019
Taichi is paired against Sudo. With four of the last eight from the Nagumo Society and the other four from the Shiranami Society, it feels a little like a team match between the societies. Chihaya takes an early lead, leading the audience to think they will be watching the rise of a new star instead of the return of a former Queen, but Inokuma rebounds and takes the lead. Sudo is throwing off Taichi but Harada-sensei shouts "Got there in time!" after he gets a card, which startles the struggling Shiranami players and helps them refocus. Chihaya takes the next card, a multi-syllable, from Inokuma's side and gives her the Chihayafuru card, which she takes from her shortly afterwards. Retro suddenly wins in Class B and Taichi and Sudo declare neither can be bested by him. Chihaya realizes she's having fun despite the stress and warms at the idea that everyone here loves karuta.
56	5	"Mount Amanokagu"; Transliteration: "Amanokaguyama" (Japanese: あまのかぐやま)	Kunio Katsuki	Yūko Kakihara	5 November 2019
Inokuma intends to disrupt Chihaya and prevent her from having fun but after seeing her son mirroring striking cards from the sidelines, decides to play true to herself, which was to have fun, and she smiles. Chihaya returns the smile. Arata loses to Hiroshi, much to the onlookers' shock, leaving him infuriated with himself. Harada-sensei then loses to Murao, leaving each society with one win. Chihaya and Taichi both go for their opponents' cards and Chihaya wins. Sudo and Taichi are left with one card each, the luck of the draw. Knowing how bad his luck with it is, Taichi instantly goes for Sudo's card and gets it first, winning. Chihaya is paired against Hiroshi but he yields rather than face a fellow society member, satisfied with what he did and willing to let Chihaya sleep. There will thus be only one semi-final match: Taichi against Murao. Inokuma approaches Sakurazawa and asks for her contact information, wanting to practice with her, and Sakurazawa gives it. Meanwhile, Taichi, determined not to lose, wins his match. The final match will be Chihaya against Taichi.
57	6	"Tatsuta River Ablaze"; Transliteration: "Nishiki nari keri" (Japanese: にしきなりけり)	Tōru Takahashi	Yūko Kakihara	12 November 2019
Arata decides to stay and watch the match with Murao and his society's president, even though it means he won't get home until morning by train. Chihaya and Taichi sit for their match and Sumire marvels at how this feels different from their matches at school. Chihaya is at the advantage since she got to rest during the last match, but Taichi uses a new placement, placing fourteen cards in the top row and rearranging how he places the rest. Designed to fight Chihaya, it puts one-syllable cards together and long cards separate as he knows she's scared of committing faults. He can also easily take cards from the long top row with thrusts. Doing this off-balances Chihaya. The others marvel at how Taichi hasn't made any mistakes. By changing his placement so drastically, it makes it easier for him to forget the previous layouts. Chihaya is pressured into a fault, forced to play defensively. Remembering Sakurazawa's advice, Chihaya fixes her posture, making it easier to breathe. While he plays like a stranger, she knows he's still Taichi and she doesn't have to be afraid of him. Determined not to lose, she takes the next card. They continue to push each other and the audience recognizes they didn't get here on momentum or luck despite their young age.
58	7	"The storm blasts" Transliteration: "Arashi fuku" (Japanese: あらしふく)	Kinsei Nakamura	Misuzu Chiba	19 November 2019
Chihaya wins the Yoshino Tournament's Class A by two cards and falls asleep. Taichi remains silent, frustrated. The Queen qualifiers are mentioned and Miyauchi tells Chihaya she can request an authorized absence from the field trip to attend. Chihaya's mother arrives, lamenting that she missed the match. Chihaya tells her she wants to be Queen, but she also wants to be a high school teacher and attend the class trip. What kind of teacher and adviser would she be if she missed her own class trip? Arata walks with Chihaya, seeing he's holding in his disappointment, and Arata is disappointed as well – because he lost he couldn't play against Chihaya. Chihaya attends the class trip instead of the Queen Qualifiers to make memories with her friends. She will compete next year. Taichi however, calls in sick and skips the class trip to attend the Meijin qualifiers. Chihaya doesn't understand why Taichi would do this as she never heard him say he wanted to be Meijin. Komano reminds her he plans to go to medical school, so by this time next year, he'll be too busy for the club and he won't have any time in medical school. This is his only chance to go as far as he can in karuta. Arata loses a practice match, his game off. His friend Yuu is waiting with a hot meal when he returns home and asks why he's so down. If he wins tomorrow, it will attract new members for his club. He tells her he doesn't need a reward for realizing his dream of being a Master, making him remember his time with his grandfather. Suō Hisashi, the current Meijin, visits Shinobu's house.
59	8	"As friends and strangers" Transliteration: "Kore ya kono" (Japanese: これやこの)	Akiko Nakano	Misuzu Chiba	26 November 2019
Sudo intends to withdraw from the Meijin qualifiers due to the bet he made earlier with Taichi. Taichi tells him to play and withdraw only if he matches against him, which Sudo agrees to. Arata is suffering from food poisoning but sees Taichi's name on the list, shocking him. Suō gives Shinobu a ride to the tournament on his motorcycle, and everyone is surprised to see the Queen and Master at the West qualifiers. Suō says he will soon pass college and get a job so he plans to retire next year, after he wins this year. Arata quickly begins winning matches. Suō approaches him, saying he is good and will be Master one day, but he won't defeat him. Taichi wonders what he wants so badly he'd miss his class trip for and his mother, having seen Taichi, is upset that he wants such a stupid thing as to be Master. She doesn't want to wait until the end of the match so she tells Sumire to call her when it finishes. Rion is the only Fujisaki student to win her match. Taichi defeats the man who beat Retro at Yoshino and encourages Retro. Retro knows he's not a good player though. He just can't admit it to himself. Though planning on getting on the good side of Taichi's mother, Sumire doesn't contact her after the match ends, seeing how important karuta is. In fact, she refuses to let Taichi's mother enter the building when she storms up. Nearby karuta players resting outside chase his mother off when she starts dissing karuta in front of them.
60	9	"I recall how my own efforts were in vain" Transliteration: "Kudakete mono o omou koro kana" (Japanese: くだけてものをおもふころかな)	Tomoya Kitagawa	Yūko Kakihara	3 December 2019
Suō and Shinobu speak before Suō leaves. Suō says nothing keeps him going, which angers Shinbou, as if "nothing" makes him that good. Chihaya is depressed on the school trip, even when her friend Michiru takes their group to a museum on the Hundred Poets. Chihaya is checking her phone for updates on Taichi and Arata's progress in the tournament. Annoyed, Michiru takes the battery. She said she wanted to come on the class trip but she's not here at all. Chihaya apologizes and focuses on having fun with her classmates. Taichi meanwhile, struggles against Shusaku Koshikawa, a rising Karuta player. Though he commits two double faults, earning his nickname "goofsaku" Koshikawa mostly stays in the lead. Taichi sends him the Chihayafuru card but loses it soon afterwards, something he knows Chihaya wouldn't have done. It comes down to luck of the draw, which Taichi loses, ending his hopes of Master. Upset, he leaves the building to cool off. After learning Harada-sensei's next opponent is Koshikawa he returns. Harada-sensei's knees are so bad his students run onto the field to pick up his cards for him. Taichi remembers when Harada-sensei told him there were some cards that statistically weren't called as often and those "old maid" cards were the ones he should send to his opponents side to increase the chance of the card on his side being read if it came to luck of the draw. Harada-sensei's match comes down to luck of the draw and his card is read. He wins. The East Master qualifiers come down to Harada-sensei against Sudo. In the West, Arata defeats his opponent and Shinobu leaves early, sure he'll win, as her stomach is growling. She's met by Ise, her old Karuta coach, but leaves coldly after he offers she come to his society to practice (as her grandmother is upset she has no friends). Shinobu thinks it's none of their business. Arata's opponent for the West Meijin qualifier is Murao from his society.
61	10	"Scarlet kadsuras" Transliteration: "Sanekazura" (Japanese: さねかづら)	Hideki Hosokawa	Yūko Kakihara	10 December 2019
The final match of the West Meijin qualifiers between Murao and Arata begins. Arata thinks about Taichi and this prevents him from concentrating on the match. Murao reckons that this is his chance to win at first, but then brings Arata to his senses. During the match Arata gets stomach-ache, so he needs to take a break. During this time four cards from the field and several dead cards were read. Arata lags behind with eleven cards difference, but still does not give up. Based on the Murao's movements, Arata determines which two-syllable cards have become monosyllabic and, therefore, which dead cards he missed. Arata begins to catch up. As a result, Arata wins with two cards difference. Western Japan will be represented by Wataya Arata and Ousoka Megumu for the Meijin and Queen's Challenger match. Chihaya is having fun with classmates at night on a trip. When she left a room to get some tea, she sees Taichi upon his arrival. He says that Arata and Harada-sensei will meet in the Challenger match, and asks who Chihaya will be rooting for.
62	11	"Leaving a hovering mist above the trees and grass" Transliteration: "Kiri tachinoboru aki no yūgure" (Japanese: きりたちのぼる あきのゆふぐれ)	Nobuaki Nakanishi	Misuzu Chiba	17 December 2019
Chihaya talks to her homeroom teacher on the subjects she could teach in the future. An emergency meeting is held at the Shiranami Society to help Harada-sensei prepare for the upcoming Challenger match. Taichi is tasked with memorizing Arata's placement, which he tries to refuse. Harada-sensei reminded Taichi that Sudo had conceded at the Master Qualifiers partly due to the bet with Taichi at the Yoshino Tournament. Chihaya proposes to memorize Suō's placement, in which she starts to realize about a possible weakness that Suō might have. Meanwhile, Inokuma practices with Sakurazawa at Fujisaki in preparation for her Challenger match, but she is forced to question whether Karuta is more important than her children when she finds out her son is sick while she was away. At the Challenger Finals, Inokuma vows to win the Queen title one more time for her children, after receiving help from Kana's mother and support from her own hakama.
63	12	"So the flower petals are scattered like the snow by the passing storm" Transliteration: "Hana sasou arashi no niwa no yuki nara de" (Japanese: はなさそふあらしのにはのゆきならで)	Kunio Katsuki; Kotono Watanabe; Kim Min-sun	Yūko Kakihara	24 December 2019
The first round of the Challenger playoffs begins. Harada-sensei takes control of the match early on, with a consecutive take. Arata counters with his flexible style and speedy takes. Tsuboguchi remarks that Harada-sensei had been studying the old Arata too well, as the new Arata slowly puts the pressure on Harada-sensei. Meanwhile, Megumu also takes the lead against Inokuma. Inokuma wonders if her time really has passed, when Megumu sends the Chiha card, apparently unaware that Inokuma's maiden name was Chihara. Harada-sensei uses his vast experience, both as a teacher and a veteran player, to level the score and eventually win the first round. Inspired by Harada-sensei's win, Inokuma turns the table on Megumu and wins the first round by 2 cards. Harada-sensei then withdraws from the second round, giving Arata a win by default, which visibly upsets Arata. Chihaya then whispers something important to Arata.
64	13	"Yet it is I who withers and wilts" Transliteration: "Furi yuku mono wa waga mi nari keri" (Japanese: ふりゆくものはわがみなりけり)	Kinsei Nakamura; Chie Yamashiro	Yūko Kakihara	7 January 2020
Arata wanders off to prepare for the third round while the second round of the Queen Challenger begins. Both players bring a keepsake to their match, signifying the blessing and support they received from those closest to them. Inokuma manages to win the second round by overcoming her fear of committing faults, becoming the Queen's Challenger. Chihaya catches a glipmse of Suō outside the karuta hall and joins him for a snack, hoping that she can uncover the reason behind his strength. The third match begins after Arata returns, wearing his grandfather's hakama. He recalls Chihaya telling him Harada-sensei will always be a mentor to them, and that he will not be able to win by being just Arata. Arata controls the flow of the game with his grandfather's style of play, an awful style of karuta that goes against ordinary conventions. Though struggling and falling behind, Harada-sensei is happy at the fact that he gets to play against the Eternal Meijin once more. His knees start to hurt again, before he sees the current Meijin Suō returning with Chihaya. Suō voices his excitement of possibly playing against Harada-sensei at the Meijin match.
65	14	"The emotions experienced" Transliteration: "Ai mite no" (Japanese: あひみての)	Tōru Takahashi; Park Jae-ik	Yūko Kakihara	14 January 2020
Kitano-sensei and Harada-sensei both think back to Harada's younger days. With a good playing sense and unstoppable momentum, he became a Meijin runner-up at the age of 26. But his job as a doctor combined with the lack of players to practice, made him lose his good playing sense. Instead, he started focusing on karuta plays that are suitable for those without good playing sense. Harada-sensei starts to close the gap between him and Arata, falling over and messing up the cards each time. In the end, Arata loses the match by committing a fault, touching a dead card which Harada-sensei manages to avoid. Arata recalls he had been placing too much emphasis on the remaining cards, because those remind him of Chihaya. He confesses his feelings to Chihaya, stating his plans to go to college in Tokyo and playing karuta with her again. Taichi asks Suō not to get close to Chihaya, lying that he is her boyfriend. Suō calls Shinobu to update her on the match results and warn her of her opponent's strength.
66	15	"As helpless autumn leaves are caught against the flow" Transliteration: "Nagare mo aenu momiji nari keri" (Japanese: ながれもあへぬ もみぢなりけり)	Chie Yamashiro; Akiko Nakano	Misuzu Chiba	21 January 2020
Mizusawa Karuta Club is preparing for the finals exam, but Chihaya cannot focus and keeps thinking about Arata's confession. Sumire tries to prevent Kana from telling Taichi about Arata's confession. Chihaya receives a call from Sudo, inviting her to play karuta at his university karuta club (at Suō's request, to help him practice for the Meijin match, and to fulfill Chihaya's request from before to play with him). Taichi joins her for the practice, and they see Koishikawa at the venue as well. He and Sudo are the only ones willing (and strong enough) to play against Suō. Taichi plays against Sudo, and Chihaya goes against Suō. Chihaya notices the way Suō looks at the card formation. She tries her best, but Suō lures her into committing faults again and again. He beats Chihaya by a huge margin, then ridicules her dream of becoming Queen.
66.5	15.5	"So I wish for a memory" Transliteration: "Ima hitotabi no" (Japanese: いまひとたびの)	Kotono Watanabe	Yūko Kakihara; Misuzu Chiba	28 January 2020
Recap episode with omake segments.
67	16	"Takes me away in haste" Transliteration: "Nusa mo toriaezu tamukeyama" (Japanese: ぬさもとりあへずたむけやま)	Tomoya Kitagawa; Akiko Nakano	Misuzu Chiba	28 January 2020
Taichi plays against Suō and berates him for ridiculing Chihaya. He loses, but without committing a single fault. He then apologies to Suō for lying about being Chihaya's boyfriend, and asks for a match review. Taichi expresses interest in Suō's playing style. Chihaya goes to see Harada-sensei and tells him about Suō's weakness. The entire Mizusawa Karuta Club spends Christmas Eve at Tsukuba's home, and try to convince his brothers that Santa Claus is real (and not played by their father). The day of the Meijin and Queen match arrives, but Chihaya notices Arata is absent at the venue. It turns out Arata has a fever and he plans to watch the match via online broadcast.
68	17	"As my sleeves are wet with dew" Transliteration: "Waga koromode wa tsuyu ni nure tsutsu" (Japanese: わがころもではつゆにぬれつつ)	Kim Seung-duk	Yūko Kakihara	4 February 2020
The first round of the Meijin and Queen match begins. Suō seems preoccupied with a phone call during the memorization time, which upsets Chihaya. She meets the Card Boys and Card Girls for the match: Hiroshi and Sudo for the Meijin match, Sakurazawa and Shinobu's fellow Myojo Society member, Momo Yuikawa (recommended to Shinobu by Ise-sensei the night before) for the Queen match. The first round between Inokuma and Shinobu went back-and-forth, but Shinobu manages to win in a luck-of-the-draw. Meanwhile, Suō tries to mimic the outcome of the Queen match, but Harada-sensei takes the last card and wins the first round. Taichi states that Suō intentionally lost, so that he can drag the match longer and control the number of wins. Chihaya visits Shinobu during the break before the second round. She accidentally reveals the reason for missing the Queen's Eastern Qualifiers (thus breaking their promise of playing at the Queen match), visibly upsetting Shinobu.
69	18	"The storm will soon carry me" Transliteration: "Arazaran" (Japanese: あらざらむ)	Kim Min-sun; Kim Sang-yeop; Masaki Matsumura	Yūko Kakihara	11 February 2020
In the second round of the Queen match, Shinobu is unable to focus and Inokuma manages to win. Out of frustration, she removes her kimono and leaves Ōmi Jingū. Chihaya spots her and follows her to the shrine where they pray. In the Meijin match, Harada-sensei manages to take a second win, putting Suō in a tough spot. He then lets Suō win the third match by a huge margin, while he recovers and prepares for the fourth match. Meanwhile, Inokuma reveals she is suffering from morning sickness (she is pregnant with her third child, most likely a girl). Shinobu returns and prepares for the third round. Chihaya manages to get Shinobu to wear tasuki to help her move more freely. They reconcile, and she start to regain her strong connection to the karuta cards in the match. At the same time, Harada-sensei takes a risky bet, changing his own formation constantly and sending cards meant to confuse Suō. It turns out that Suō's weakness is his eyes, more specifically, he cannot see things at the edge of his vision. It was revealed that Suō's relative also has the same affliction, albeit a much severe version where she can only perceive around thirty square centimeters of a television screen.
70	19	"Bring a life of everlasting love" Transliteration: "Mi o tsukushite ya" (Japanese: みをつくしてや)	Kunio Katsuki; Kotono Watanabe; THE SUN	Misuzu Chiba	18 February 2020
In the Queen match, Inokuma commits a double fault at the end, giving Shinobu the win and a third consecutive Queen title. Suō's past is explained. He lives with his extended family at a young age and grew particularly close to his aunt Yukiko. It was explained that Suō came into contact with karuta in university, and subsequently learned that he has the same affliction as Yukiko. As the affliction worsens, it will end with blindness. Motivated by Yukiko to make something of himself, Suō became the Meijin using his gift. Back in the fourth round, Harada-sensei takes the lead, but Suō catches up as the round progresses and the unique syllables change. Harada-sensei notes that Suō stopped paying attention to the Queen's match. Harada-sensei later sends the Naniwae card, which he believes will not be read. Suō notices this as well, but he cannot find the opportunity to send it back. The fourth round comes down to a luck-of-the-draw.
71	20	"May the scarlet kadsuras" Transliteration: "Na ni shi owaba" (Japanese: なにしおはば)	Hideki Hosokawa; Mitsuhiro Yoneda	Yūko Kakihara	25 February 2020
In the luck-of-the-draw, Suō uses his usual playing style and goads Harada-sensei into committing a fault, forcing a fifth round. Shinobu states that she is looking forward to the next year's Queen match, after learning that Chihaya used her prized Daddy Bear autographed handkerchief to make the tasuki she wore. In the fifth round, Suō faces Harada-sensei with respect, winning by a twelve card margin, and becoming an Eternal Meijin. He maintains his intention to retire, but Arata barges into the winner's interview and convinces Suō to extend his reign by one more year. Chihaya and the gang return to Tokyo by bullet train, but they notice Taichi is not with them. It turns out he is staying back to play at the Takamatsu Memorial Cup being held the very next day.
72	21	"To restore my faith" Transliteration: "Hito mo oshi" (Japanese: ひともをし)	Tōru Takahashi; Masaki Matsumura; Kim Sang-yeop	Misuzu Chiba	3 March 2020
Taichi plays at the Takamatsu Memorial Cup, while Chihaya and the gang play at the New Year's Karuta Tournament in Tokyo. Tsukuba states that he intends to win the C class tournament and be the next Mizusawa Karuta Club president. Retro and the other Hokuo members are also at the same venue, but he loses the Class B final to Midori Tamaru. Meanwhile, Chihaya competes against Sudo in the Class A final. At Ōmi Jingū, Taichi runs into Arata, but he states that Chihaya is not there. Both players face each other in the top eight, and they made clear to each other their feelings to Chihaya through the Chihayafuru card. Suō returns to collect the winner's trophy and spots both players, wondering who would be the one to face him in one year's time. In the end, Chihaya wins against Sudo, while Arata is the runner up (he lost to Murao in the final). Suō and Taichi return to Tokyo together by bullet train.
73	22	"Just as my beauty has faded" Transliteration: "Nagame seshi ma ni" (Japanese: ながめせしまに)	Michiru Itabisashi	Yūko Kakihara	10 March 2020
Taichi is in a slump after the Takamatsu Memorial Cup. Chihaya notices this and tries to cheer him up. Kana suggests making chocolate treats for the boys in time for Valentine's Day. Sumire confesses her feelings to Taichi, but she also tells him to convey his feelings to Chihaya. The Valentine's Day party doesn't go well, after they discover that Chihaya's father ate all the treats, thinking that the treats were meant for him. Undeterred, Chihaya starts making plans to celebrate Taichi's birthday in April. She gets Hiroshi to talk to Taichi about his loss to Arata. Taichi wants to confess to Chihaya, but Sumire tells him to wait for two more weeks. Two weeks later, the Taichi cup is held, organized completely by Misuzawa Karuta Club and featuring karuta players that want to celebrate Taichi's birthday.
74	23	"Like a boatsman adrift" Transliteration: "Wataru funabito kaji o tae" (Japanese: わたるふなびとかぢをたえ)	Chie Yamashiro; Tomoya Kitagawa	Yūko Kakihara	17 March 2020
The Taichi cup is an unofficial karuta tournament, attended by thirty six players who want to celebrate Taichi's birthday. The tournament is played in a Genpei style, a three on three game where all hundred cards are in play. Each player competes against the opposite team and his own teammates to collect the most cards. Retro and Taichi reminisces about the time they played with Arata and Chihaya. In the end, Chihaya and Taichi tie with the highest points in the tournament. Meanwhile, Arata thinks back to the Takamatsu Memorial Cup, where he won against Taichi but couldn't refocus afterwards. The Chihayafuru card was never read, but he wonders if he could have protected the card against Taichi. Taichi and Chihaya spend time at the karuta club room. Taichi tells Chihaya that he took Arata's glasses back during the sixth grade karuta tournament. He decides to stop being a coward and confess his feelings to Chihaya. Chihaya apologies and leaves. The karuta club members prepare for the new term's club demo, but Miyauchi-sensei tells them that Taichi quits the club. Chihaya tries to convince Taichi to stay, but Taichi kisses her and refuses, asking her whether she thinks he is made of stone. He tells her that ever since she rejected him, the karuta cards all appear black in colour to him.
75	24	"When winds send waves crashing" Transliteration: "Kaze o itami" (Japanese: かぜをいたみ)	Hideki Hosokawa; Kotono Watanabe; Kunio Katsuki; Masaki Matsumura	Yūko Kakihara	24 March 2020
Chihaya discusses with her new homeroom teacher on her future prospects as a high school teacher/club advisor. Taichi's mother discovered Taichi is no longer the number one in studies, but she is equally shocked when she hears Taichi has quit the karuta club. Worried about the state of Mizusawa Karuta Club, Miyauchi-sensei checks up on them and finds Sumire leading the club introductions, to her surprise. Tamaru, and three other students, have become new members. Chihaya finds it to play karuta, as she also sees the karuta only in black colour. She tells Fukasaku-sensei that she is the rock in the Kazewoitami poem, crushing Taichi's feelings. Fukasaku-sensei recommends she learn something, anything that can help her to grow. Taichi starts attending cram school, and he sees Suō at the venue (as a teacher). Meanwhile, Arata tries to recruit new members to create a karuta club at his high school. His juniors at Nagumo Society, Shun and Hiro Matsubayashi, are first to join, but they need two more members to become an official club. He manages to recruit three more, and with the help of Kuriyama-sensei, they are able to hold a joint practice session with Fujisaki Karuta Club. Arata learns from Sakurazawa that both Taichi and Chihaya have quit the Mizusawa Karuta Club. He sends them a photo of his karuta club, with a message to meet at Ōmi Jingū (for the high school championship).
