= Enchondromatosis =

- Specialty: Medical genetics

Enchondromatosis is a form of osteochondrodysplasia characterized by a proliferation of enchondromas.

Ollier disease can be considered a synonym for enchondromatosis. Maffucci syndrome is enchondromatosis with hemangiomatosis.
