= Diffuse neonatal hemangiomatosis =

- Specialty: Dermatology

Diffuse neonatal hemangiomatosis (DNH) is a potentially fatal disorder where multiple benign (non-cancerous) blood vessel tumors (hemangiomas) are present in the skin and other organs. The mortality rate of diffuse neonatal hemangiomatosis is 50-90%. This disease is normally found in female Caucasian infants. The most common site of internal organ damage, or lesions, is the liver, which can redirect blood away from the heart and cause arteriovenous shunting. This can cause high cardiac output, leading to further complications such as congestive heart failure. This condition affecting the liver is also known as infantile hepatic hemangioma (IHH). Other sites of internal organ damage can include the intestines, nervous system, lungs, and sometimes the skeletal system. Early detection and treatment with steroids results in most newborn babies with this disease remaining healthy, with serious problems developing for some individuals during the hemangioma's growth phase.

== Diagnosis ==
Newborn babies with multiple cutaneous hemangiomas or large facial hemangiomas are associated with a greater likelihood of internal organ involvement. These infants should be carefully observed and have abdominal screenings to rule out internal organ involvement, with additional brain ultrasonography and Doppler studies if needed. Liver involvement complications such as high-output heart failure include signs and symptoms such as tachypnea, hepatomegaly, jaundice, diaphoresis, and nasal flares.

=== Differential Diagnosis ===
In the past, the diagnosis of "diffuse neonatal hemangiomatosis" included both infantile hemangioma (IH) and multifocal lymphangioendotheliomatosis with thrombocytopenia (MLT). With advances in medicine and vascular anomalies, there is now a differentiation between the diagnosis of IH, which is benign, and MLT, which has a high mortality rate. Because of this misdiagnosis of MLT as DNH, it is believed that DNH has lower mortality rate than the report 50-90% that it is currently believed to have.

In a literature review of 73 cases of DNH that have been reported, many of these reports classified diffuse neonatal hemangiomatosis as other multifocal vascular abnormalities such as multifocal lymphangioendotheliomatosis with thrombocytopenia (MLT). It is important to have an accurate diagnosis and reference the correct data in order to administer adequate treatment for individuals.

== Mechanism ==
Cutaneous hemangiomas are non-cancerous tumors that are commonly present at infancy, affecting around 4-10% of newborns. Around 80% of these hemangiomas stay as a single lesion, or tumor. However, when the presence of multiple lesions (hemangiomatosis) have involvement in both skin and with other organs of the newborn, this condition is called diffuse neonatal hemangiomatosis. Multiple cutaneous hemangiomas or large facial hemangiomas are associated with a greater possibility of multiple organ involvement, or internal hemangiomatosis. The liver is the most common organ involvement in diffuse neonatal hemangiomatosis, and its involvement can be determined through imaging and presence of hepatomegaly, or enlarged liver. The multiple lesions on the liver cause arteriovenous shunts, causing high-output heart failure and pulmonary hypertension as compensation.

=== Classifications ===
Hepatic hemangiomas have three different classifications that help improve management and risks. The three types include focal, multifocal, and diffuse.

Focal hepatic hemangiomas are large tumors that are present at birth and not associated with skin lesions. In addition, they remain solitary and do not express the glucose transporter 1 channel (GLUT-1), which is found in hemangiomas on the skin. Focal hemangiomas can resolve without treatment.

Multifocal hepatic hemangiomatosis have GLUT-1 expressed as multiple lesions, often having no symptoms or complications. A percentage of these hemangiomatosis will result in high-output heart failure.

Diffuse hepatic hemangiomatosis is classified as a large replacement of the functional tissue of the liver with hemangiomas. Generally, these newborns will suffer from signs and symptoms of hepatomegaly, as well as respiratory complications. This classification has also been associated with hypothyroidism, which can also contribute to heart failure in the newborn. Diffuse hepatic hemangiomatosis carries a poor prognosis and high risk of mortality.

== Epidemiology ==
The cause of IH is not completely clear and infants often do not show signs of IH when discharged after birth. However, several risk factors may be associated with the development of IH, with the most important risk factor being low birth weight. One study showed that for every 500 gram decrease in normal birth weight, there was a 40% increased risk of having an IH. Other risk factors include the sex, including individuals with female infants, being more likely to develop an IH, multiple gestation pregnancy, antenatal vaginal bleeding, and advanced maternal age. Traditionally, IH was viewed as a sporadic disorder, but continuous research has seen that genetic predisposition may play a role in individuals who develop IH.

== Hepatic hemangiomas ==
Hepatic hemangiomas are the most common site for internal organ damage. Hepatic hemangiomas may be difficult to identify, because it can be inaccurately diagnosed as a hyper-vascular malignancy. These malignancies can live alongside other liver tumors such as hepatic cysts, hepatic angiosarcoma, focal nodular hyperplasia, and a myriad of others. Hepatic hemangiomas are usually small and discovered by chance when looking at the liver with an ultrasound, MRI, or other medical scans. Normally, these hepatic hemangiomas are seen on the right lobe of the liver.

In many circumstances, infants with multiple marks on the skin have hepatic hemangiomas. One retrospective review followed 26 infants between 1996–2007 to evaluate the management of hepatic hemangiomas and whether the infants required more complex treatment methods. The infants were classified as having either focal (8), multiple (12), or diffuse (6) lesions, or injuries. All of the infants who had multiple or diffuse injuries were assessed and screened for congestive heart failure and hypothyroidism, in which four patients later developed congestive heart failure. During the review, nine infants required treatment with steroids, and three infants received additional treatment with alpha-interferon after poor response to the steroids. The review concluded that individuals with multiple marks on the skin required screening for hepatic hemangiomas, and individuals with multifocal or diffuse liver hemangiomas required screening for heart failure and hypothyroidism to determine the most effective treatment method. In addition, the condition of an individual's injuries can indicate whether hepatic hemangiomas are present and if extensive treatment is needed.

Another retrospective review followed 25 infants over a span of ten years with a serious case of hemangiomas, which could even be life-threatening. 68% of the infants displayed an injury in the blood vessel to indicate a hemangioma. 23 out of the 25 infants were given corticosteroids to treat their condition with a range of responses from complete failure to rapid improvement. 30% of the infants given corticosteroids failed the treatment while 30% of the infants saw dramatic improvement in their condition. Out of the 25 infants, three of the infants were diagnosed with hepatic hemangiomas and were associated with cardiac failure and a high mortality rate. In the end, the three infants with hepatic hemangiomas died due to the high mortality.

== Intracranial hemangiomas ==
The patient was suspected to have a fetal brain tumor found through a prenatal ultrasonography when the mother was at 39 weeks gestation. Three weeks later, the ultrasonography showed a light mass on the fetus' frontal lobe. This tumor had no blood flow going to it as seen by the color sonography. The mother had a normal medical history and no hereditary condition.

The infant was 3.1 kg and had normal movement. With a CT scan, it was found that there was cranial edema, and a round mass in the frontal lobe. At birth, there was no skin discoloration. However, six days later, the skin discoloration was found on the abdomen and right scrotum. Additionally, at day six, a four-centimeter hepatic mass was found on the left lobe. On days 13 and 17, a hepatic hemorrhage was found on the left lobe, and the right lobe was damaged as well. The CT scan also found damage to the paraspinal muscles. Then, the provider decided to give the infant propranolol 3 mg/kg/day.

The baby was not taken in for a second round of treatment until two months and 22 days later. The tumor noticeably shrank to cysts; however, the biggest cyst was at the frontal lobe. A myriad of lesions were still found on the thalamus, pons, cerebral hemispheres, cerebellum, and choroid plexus. It was then the radiologist diagnosed the patient with diffuse neonatal hemangiomatosis. At nine months, the patient experienced loss of brain tissue due to the shrunken tumor.

Second to the liver, the brain is the most common place for diffuse neonatal hemangiomatosis. With that being said, there have only been only 16 cases of cranial hemangioma. Nine out of the total 16 cases undergo neurological manifestations. With damage to the brain, the skin red discolorations are usually 0.5–1.5 centimeters.

As emphasized before, it is rare to have a fetal brain tumor. With intracranial hemangiomas, hemorrhages are seen frequently. Since shrinkage of organs, otherwise known as involution, is found with cutaneous hemangioma, it can be said that involution can be used to help diagnose diffuse neonatal hemangiomatosis.

Finally, there is no set therapy or treatment for intracranial hemangioma. For now, small damages are only observed due to the expectation of shrinkage. Oral steroids, vinscritine, thalidomide, temozolomide, propranolol, interferon, and bevacizumab can be used to combat intracranial hemangioma. Propranolol is the most common treatment, although it is not established as a standard treatment. It is essential to follow up three months after the diagnosis of intracranial hemangiomas.

== Treatments ==
=== Oral Corticosteroids ===
Oral corticosteroids are the primary treatment for hemangiomas, especially in those that have accompanying complications such as respiratory and cardiac issues. The initial discovery of the effectiveness of corticosteroids occurred when administered to a child with thrombocytopenia, and, as a result, the size of the hemangiomas decreased. Corticosteroids that are often used include Prednisone or Prednisolone, and the average dosing is 2–3 mg/kg given daily in the morning. However, the dosing can vary based on the severity of the illness present. The exact mechanism of action is not entirely understood, but it has been proposed that the constriction of blood vessels and prevention of new blood vessel formation could be contributing to its efficacy. Some common side effects can be mood changes, elevated blood pressure, swelling of the face, weight gain, and stomach upset. If the corticosteroid treatment is effective, there should be a noticeable stopping of growth or decrease in size of the hemangiomas after two weeks. Although, stopping the growth of the hemangiomas is more commonly seen. The ineffectiveness of treatment or disruptive side effects have led to the pursuit of other secondary treatments.

=== Cyclophosphamide ===
A case report involving a four month old girl who was diagnosed with heart failure and critical hemangiomas located on the skin, head, mouth, and liver with resistance to steroid treatment, was given Cyclophosphamide. Cyclophosphamide is an anti-cancer agent that causes immune suppression. The course of therapy was IV Cyclophosphamide 10 mg/kg/day with Mesna (used to help protect the bladder from harmful side effects of using Cyclophosphamide) 10 mg/kg/day for four days. The second course was given 10 days later. After 12 days of therapy, the hemangiomas on the liver decreased in size and the hemangiomas on the skin were drying out. The third and final course of therapy was given 2.5 weeks after the second course. 10 days after the cessation of therapy, the hepatic hemangiomas size remained stable and newborn was able to gain some weight and be physically active. The heart failure was found to have resolved four months later. One year later, the hepatic hemangioma was barely visible on imaging and the majority of the hemangiomas on the skin were gone. She was reassessed at six years old and was overall relatively healthy, had no cardiac issues, no signs of hemangiomas, and no signs or symptoms of liver disease.

Two other case reports found that using Cyclophosphamide 10 mg/kg/day along with Mesna after the lack of improvement on four days of corticosteroids, resulted in noticeable shrinkage of the tumors. Some side effects that can occur with the use of this medication include damage to bone tissue, heart muscle, lungs, and possible hemorrhaging. There were no side effects experienced by the two infants of these reports. The rounds of therapy were administered every two weeks and because of an effective response to the Cyclophosphamide, the infants stopped the therapy after three and four doses. The infant that received three rounds of therapy had no noticeable liver or skin hemangiomas after nine months of receiving the last dose. The infant that received four rounds of therapy had no detectable hemangiomas after six months of receiving the last dose. Those who were involved in the case reports suggest that it is a requirement to have assertive and forceful treatment. They concluded that Cyclophosphamide is safe for diffuse neonatal hemangiomatosis.

=== Propranolol ===
Propranolol, a beta-blocker medication, has undoubtedly replaced corticosteroids as the preferred first line treatment of therapy for infantile hemangiomas after a dramatic shift in the management of IH since 2008. The reasons for the change to propranolol include its efficacy and safety as being superior to those of oral corticosteroids. More studies have been done to assess the treatment of beta-blockers, both systemic and topical, for treating infants with IH. Recently, the topical beta-blocker timolol, a medication for eye treatment, has been offered as an alternative medication for smaller IH. Although more infants are treated with propranolol instead of oral corticosteroids, more research is needed to fully understand the treatment and management of IH with propranolol.

Although the exact mechanism of action of beta-blockers for treating IH is not fully known, it can be hypothesized that beta-blockers work to inhibit growth of the hemangiomas by vasoconstriction, apoptosis induction, and the recruitment of endothelial progenitor cells (EPCs) where the marks are located. Beta-adrenergic receptors are found and expressed on the endothelial cells present in IH which induce vasodilation and increased blood flow. Inhibiting these receptors leads to vasoconstriction which can reduce blood flow to the site of the hemangioma and the size of the hemangioma. Blocking the beta-receptors can also initiate apoptosis of the endothelial cells to decrease the symptoms of the hemangioma and decrease the movement of EPCs to sites that are predisposed to the formation of the hemangiomas.

One study looked at the use of propranolol, a beta-blocker medication, for treating infantile hepatic hemangiomas. The study followed 8 infants with infantile hepatic hemangiomas under three classifications: focal, multifocal, or diffuse. 4 infants had multifocal hepatic injuries (4 to 20 injuries) and 4 infants had diffuse injuries (more than 20 injuries).The diffuse IHH are life-threatening because they can induce heart failure. Systemic steroids were given as first-line treatment for the infants with heart failure, but were stopped due to inefficacy or lack of improvement of IHH. The infants were given propranolol and a majority saw improvement in their condition. The first three infants saw undetectable injuries after 1 month of propranolol, and the other infants saw a decrease in size of the injuries of 50% after 2 to 4 months. One infant also saw a reduction in overall liver size. Propranolol greatly improved symptoms for the 8 infants with infantile hepatic hemangiomas, with a range of responses from significant improvement to complete resolution of the injuries.

Another case report involving the use of propranolol was performed on a neonatal that had multiple hemangiomas on the skin, scalp, lips, brain, liver, lungs, kidney, and bones. The neonatal was also diagnosed with cerebral palsy. Initially, prednisolone was given as a first line treatment at 4 mg/kg/day for four weeks from 27 to 55 postnatal days. This therapy was not effective, and the medical team switched to administering propranolol 2 mg/kg/day for two weeks. After the two week treatment, the hemangiomas decreased in size and had no acute hemorrhage. The use of propranolol was also found not to be associated with any severe adverse effects. The newborn baby was discharged with a four-month supply of propranolol to be administered at home. After the four-month course, the newborn baby was examined, and the size of the hemangiomas on the scalp, neck, skin, bones, brain, and kidney had decreased in size and number. The hemangiomas on the liver persisted but the ones on the lungs disappeared. At 10 months of age, the cerebral palsy was found to have improved. Although corticosteroids are the first line treatment option, the success rates are only 30-60%. That is why there are alternative second line treatment options, like propranolol. There is no established dosing at this time due to lack of studies. But, it is recommended to be on Propranolol therapy for at least seven months post birth to minimize any further replication of the hemangiomas.

An additional study noted the effectiveness of propranolol in 3 infants with infantile hepatic hemangiomas and skin hemangiomas. Two of the infants had cardiovascular complications and the other infant had hypothyroidism. All of the infants were given oral propranolol and saw a decrease in symptoms of the both hepatic and skin hemangiomas. The results of the study also observed a decrease in cardiovascular symptoms as well as thyroid requirement. Propranolol has been recognized to decrease the growth of the hemangiomas and rapidly improve symptoms. It has been used for many decades for the treatment of hypertension and arrhythmias, with less attention on treatment of IH. Side effects of propranolol that could arise include hypotension, hypoglycemia, restlessness, decreased appetite, and bradycardia. There is still much research needed to identify optimal dosing of propranolol, indications, and safety, but propranolol is noted to be a promising first-line treatment method for individuals with IH.

=== Radiotherapy ===
Radiotherapy helps get rid of blood vessels that are not fully developed due to fast reproduction. However, getting rid of these types of blood vessels have negative effects such as damaging other organs in the body. Thus, this is no longer an option for therapy.

=== Surgery ===
Surgery is an effective option, but has high mortality rates. The mortality rate is 20%.

== Future Directional Treatments ==
=== mTOR Inhibitors ===
Other medications are currently being considered as treatment for diffuse neonatal hemangiomatosis. mTOR inhibitors, an inhibitor that is normally used for post-organ transplantation, has previously been used for vascular anomalies. mTOR is controlled by phosphoinositide 3-kinase which is essential in cell function. Given its immunosuppressive, antiangiogenic, and antiproliferative characteristics, it could slow down disease progression. For example, the mTOR inhibitor, Sirolimus, can be used to treat diffuse neonatal hemangiomatosis. Diffuse neonatal hemangiomatosis therapy requires a multidisciplinary team approach due to its perplexing, rare properties.

=== Interferon Alpha-2a ===
The use of Interferon Alpha-2a in infants that are resistant to corticosteroid treatment is an ongoing study of effectiveness and appropriateness of therapy. Interferon Alpha-2a is an anti-viral medication. It was studied among 20 neonatal and infant subjects that had life-threatening hemangiomas and were not responding positively to corticosteroid treatment. They were given daily subcutaneous injections of Interferon Alfa-2a 3 million units/0.5mL. The duration of treatment varied based on clinical response. There were no serious side effects observed and fever was the most common side effect which was promptly treated with Acetaminophen. On average, 7.8 months of treatment were necessary to reduce the size of the hemangiomas at least 50% or more.

=== Vincristine (VCR) ===
The use of VCR is proposed in the setting of infants with severe hemangiomas with complications and that are unresponsive to corticosteroid treatment. VCR is a vinca alkaloid and works by binding to the tubulin in tumor cells and causes cell destruction. It also limits the development of new blood vessels that is induced by vascular endothelial growth factor (VEGF). The typical dosing of VCR is 1 mg/m^{2} slow intravenous injection. In the beginning phases of treatment, the injections are administered weekly and then tapered based on how the hemangiomas are responding and the presence/lack of accompanying symptoms. The decision to stop therapy is made when the hemangiomas have disappeared or have significantly decreased in size and if the accompanying symptoms have gone away. The length of therapy ranges from 1.5–8 months, with positive responses being observed after one month of therapy. There hasn't been any documented regrowth of hemangiomas after cessation of therapy with VCR. The common side effects tend to be mild and include constipation, stomach pain, acid reflux, and anemia. If the infant is suffering from anemia as a side effect, it is not recommended to administer Erythropoietin because it can cause replication of cells and hemangiomas on the face can develop as a result.

== See also ==
- Infantile hemangioma
- Benign neonatal hemangiomatosis
- List of cutaneous conditions
