= Benign neonatal hemangiomatosis =

Medical condition in infants with multiple skin hemangiomas

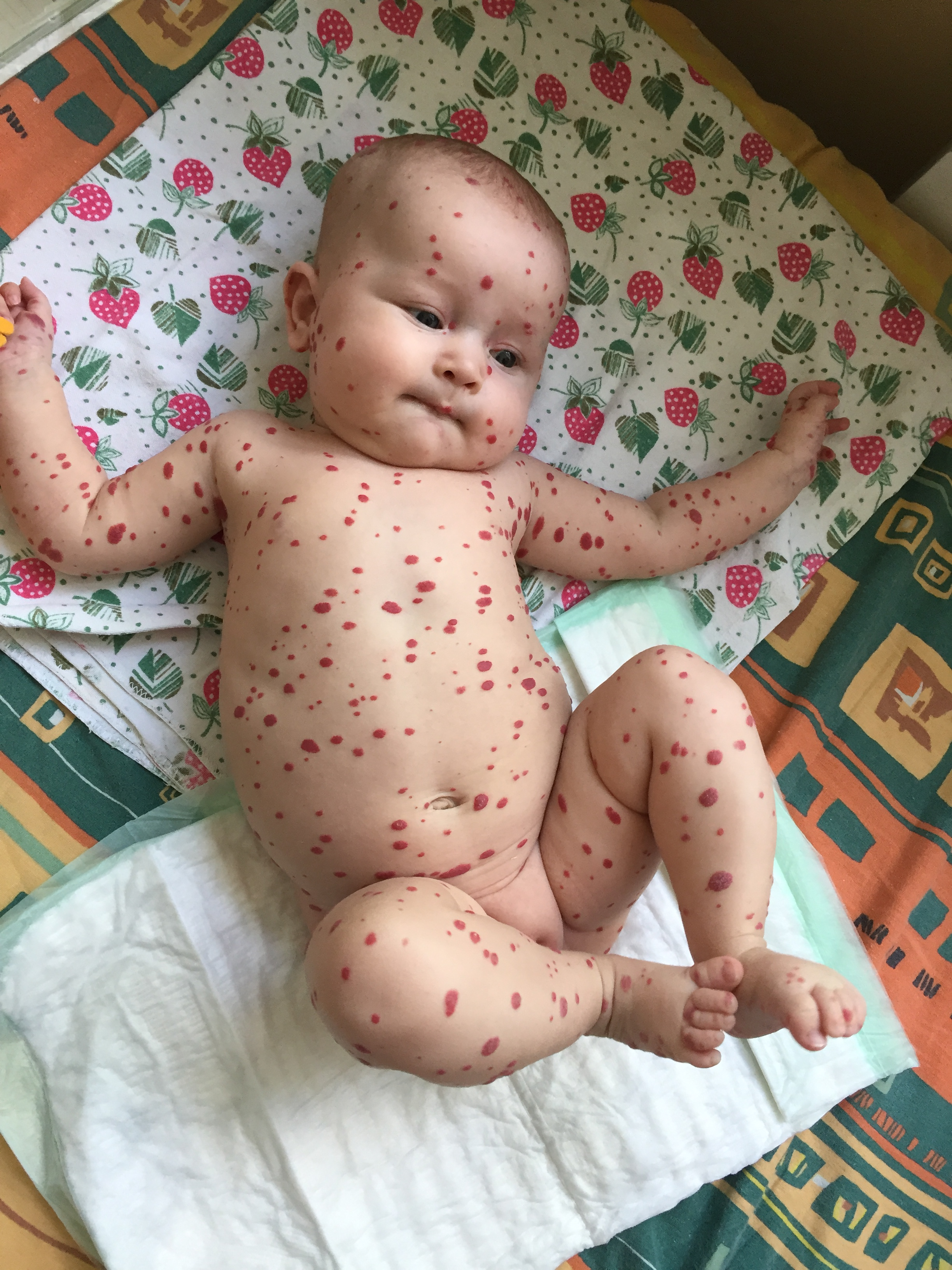
- Specialty: Dermatology

Benign neonatal hemangiomatosis is a rare skin condition that presents in infancy with multiple benign tumors called infantile hemangiomas, but without hemangiomas in other organs.

== See also ==
- Infantile hemangioma
- Diffuse neonatal hemangiomatosis
- List of cutaneous conditions
