= High affinity copper uptake protein 1 =

Protein-coding gene in the species Homo sapiens

SLC31A1

Identifiers
- Aliases: SLC31A1, COPT1, CTR1, solute carrier family 31 member 1
- External IDs: OMIM: 603085; MGI: 1333843; GeneCards: SLC31A1
Available structures
PDB	Ortholog search: PDBe RCSB
PDB	List of PDB id codes 2LS2, 2LS3, 2LS4

Gene location (Human)
Chr.	Chromosome 9 (human)
Band	9q32	Start	113,221,544 bp
Band	9q32	End	113,264,492 bp

Gene location (Mouse)
Chr.	Chromosome 4 (mouse)
Band	4|4 B3	Start	62,278,964 bp
Band	4|4 B3	End	62,310,006 bp
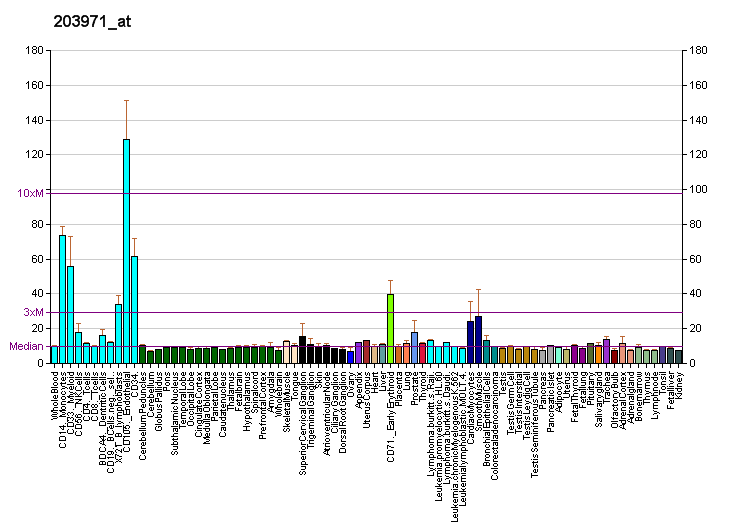
RNA expression pattern
Bgee	Human / Mouse (ortholog); Top expressed in: parotid gland; jejunal mucosa; olfactory zone of nasal mucosa; duodenum; liver; mucosa of paranasal sinus; right lobe of liver; nasal epithelium; cartilage tissue; amniotic fluid / Top expressed in: Ileal epithelium; choroid plexus of fourth ventricle; Epithelium of choroid plexus; right kidney; superior cervical ganglion; proximal tubule; yolk sac; epithelium of lens; left lung lobe; jejunum; More reference expression data
BioGPS	More reference expression data
Gene ontology
Molecular function	copper ion transmembrane transporter activity; identical protein binding
Cellular component	cytoplasm; integral component of membrane; recycling endosome; soma; late endosome; plasma membrane; integral component of plasma membrane; membrane
Biological process	cellular response to cisplatin; copper ion transport; copper ion import; ion transport; xenobiotic transmembrane transport; copper ion transmembrane transport; cellular copper ion homeostasis; copper ion import across plasma membrane
Sources:Amigo / QuickGO
Orthologs
Databases	NCBI: entry; OMA: entry
Species	Human	Mouse
Entrez	1317	20529
Ensembl	ENSG00000136868	ENSMUSG00000066150
UniProt	O15431	Q8K211
RefSeq (mRNA)	NM_001859	NM_175090
RefSeq (protein)	NP_001850	NP_780299
Location (UCSC)	Chr 9: 113.22 – 113.26 Mb	Chr 4: 62.28 – 62.31 Mb
PubMed search
- Wikidata
View/Edit Human	View/Edit Mouse

High affinity copper uptake protein 1 (CTR1) is a transmembrane protein that is encoded by the SLC31A1 gene in humans.

Copper is an element essential for life, but excessive copper can be toxic or even lethal to the cell. Therefore, cells have developed sophisticated ways to maintain a critical copper balance, with the intake, export, and intracellular compartmentalization or buffering of copper strictly regulated. The 2 related genes ATP7A and ATP7B, responsible for the human diseases Menkes syndrome and Wilson disease, respectively, are involved in copper export. In S. cerevisiae, the copper uptake genes CTR1, CTR2, and CTR3 have been identified, and in human the CTR1 and CTR2 (MIM 603088) genes have been identified.

== Structure ==
The first 3D structure of hCTR1 was based on electron crystallography, revealing that hCTR1 has a homotrimeric channel-like architecture. It consists of three indentical monomers, the monomers oligomerize through their transmembrane regions, and a monomer of hCtr1 has these characteristics:

- 60 amino acids in the extracellular N-terminal domain
- three transmembrane helices (TM1, 2, and 3)
- an intracellular loop of 46 amino acids connecting TM1 and TM2
- a short intracellular C-terminal domain of 15 amino acids.

The homotrimeric assembly is conserved across species, from plants, yeast to mammals.

== Function ==
Dietary copper enters the bloodstream primarily in its oxidized Cu(II) form. Once absorbed, Cu(II) is taken up by the hCTR1, which mediates its cellular import.

At the extracellular face, the flexible N-termini extends outward and captures Cu(II) from the blood carrier protein, after that it reduces Cu(II) to Cu(I) state and preserves the reduced Cu(I) oxidation state. The extracellular domain of hCTR1 holds both Cu(II) and Cu(I) binding sites: ^{1}MDHxHH and ^{22}HHH, serve as two Cu(II) binding sites; ^{7}MxMxxM and ^{41}MMMxM, comprise the first Cu(I) binding sites in the extracellular domain of hCTR1. The extracellular hCTR1 domain is also characterized by two glycosylation sites, N15 and T27.

The transmembrane domain of hCTR1 is characterized by ^{150}MxxxM and ^{167}GxxxG motifs. In the second transmembrane helix, M150 and M154 are considered as Cu(I)-binding residues. There are two methionine triads lining the pore, and these methionine rings have soft sulfur ligands and create the "selectivity filter" for Cu(I), that excludes harder ions such as Ca(II).

The hCTR1 C-terminal domain controls the distribution of Cu(I), it plays a role in copper trafficking and regulation. It interacts with metallochaperones and with the of the ^{188}HCH motif transfers the Cu(I) ion to Atox1. Althogether hCTR1 operates as a dynamic, adaptable transporter, delicately balancing the flexibility and selectivity of copper ions.

Copper in the cells is cofactor in cuproenzymes such as cytochrome c oxidase, superoxide dismutase, tyrosinase, dopamine β-hydroxylase, and lysyl oxidase, therefore it supports mitochondrial energy production, antioxidant defense, connective tissue maturation, pigment formation, and neurotransmitter biosynthesis.

=== Regulation of hCTR1 ===
hCTR1 is the principal high-affinity Cu(I) importer in human cells. However copper overload results in oxidative damage and cellular toxicity. Consequently, cells maintain strict translational and post-translational control of hCTR1 to prevent copper overload.

A key mechanism is copper-stimulated endocytosis of hCTR1. hCTR1 is rapidly internalized from the plasma membrane after exposure to elevated copper Copper-triggered endocytosis of hCTR1 is clathrin dependent and reversible. When extracellular Cu is depleted or reduced, internalized hCTR1 is re-routed to restore copper uptake capacity. But prolonged high copper concentration can also target internalized hCTR1 for lysosomal degradation, leading to a net decrease in hCTR1 protein levels. Another mechanism suggests that excess copper triggers monomerization of hCTR1 homotrimer, thereby preventing further copper influx. These dynamic trafficking events and the regulatory oligomerization state of hCTR1 are the safeguard against toxicity.

At the transcriptional level, the mammalian SLC31A1 gene is regulated by the Sp1 transcription factor. In Sp1 the Zn(II) in the zinc finger domains can be displaced by Cu(I), this change inhibites its DNA-binding and downregulates SLC31A1 transcription. This interplay between rapid retrieval and downregulation constitutes a potent post-translational and translational feedback loop controlling copper influx.

=== Crosstalk with Other Metals ===
hCTR1 is highly selective for copper due to the rich methionine transmembrane selectivity filter, copper homeostasis does not operate in isolation.

One well documented but still controversial direct interaction is with zinc.The interaction between zinc and copper is highly complex. Zn(II) can antagonize copper uptake in vivo, high zinc possibly induces a functional copper deficiency. Oral zinc therapy is used to treat Wilson’s disease patients by blocking intestinal copper absorption. There are four principal levels of crosstalk: intestinal absorption, the transcriptional regulation of SLC31A1, direct interactions with hCTR1 and zinc-dependent modulation mediated by Zinc Transporter 1.

Another important crosstalk is silver. Ag(I) is chemically similar to Cu(I), both are monovalent “soft” cations, and silver can enter cells via hCTR1. Experimentally, silver ions have been shown to inhibit copper uptake by blocking hCTR1. Met43 and Met45 within the N-terminal domain are key residues responsible for Ag(I) coordination. This cross-reactivity has practical implications, for instance silver-based antimicrobials could disrupt human copper homeostasis by competing for hCTR1. Furthermore dietary silver or high copper concentrations could interfere with zinc and iron metabolism due to shared regulatory networks.

Copper homeostasis also intersects with platinum, which is very well documented in the context of chemotherapy. The commonly used platinum drug, cisplatin enters cells partly via hCTR1. Studies have found a significant correlation between cellular hCTR1 levels and cisplatin accumulation and sensitivity to the drug. Raising extracellular copper can reduce cisplatin uptake and toxicity, likely by downregulating hCTR1 at the membrane. Conversely, copper chelation or deficiency might increase hCTR1 levels and potentially enhance cisplatin import.

=== Interaction with Chaperones ===
The key copper chaperones in human cells include Copper transport protein (Atox1), Copper chaperone for superoxide dismutase (CCS), and Cytochrome c oxidase copper chaperone (COX17).

== Clinical significance ==
=== Inherited Neurodegenerative Diseases ===
In 2022, a new autosomal-recessive disease was discovered that is caused by mutations of the CTR1 gene. The disease is characterized by profound deficiency of copper in the central nervous system and presents with infantile seizures and neurodegeneration. hCTR1 has been implicated in neurological disorders.

Copper imbalance is a hallmark of various neurodegenerative disorders, including Alzheimer’s disease, Parkinson’s disease, where amyloid-β peptides bind copper and generate oxidative stress. Furthermore is's associated with Huntington’s disease, prion diseases, and Amyotrophic lateral sclerosis. The hCTR1-Atox1-ATP7A/B axis is also associated with Menkes disease and Wilson’s disease, in both cases the pathology is driven primarily by mutations in proteins that regulate copper homeostasis, most notably disease-causing mutations in ATP7A or ATP7B, which lead to systemic copper deficiency or copper overload.

Moreover, the human eye, and particularly the retina, is composed of highly specialized neurons, and hCTR1 plays a vital role in maintaining copper homeostasis across ocular tissues. Increased hCTR1 expression has been reported in patients with Eales disease and copper has been identified as a major driver of vision loss in ischemic and diabetic retinopathies.

=== Connection with Cancer treatment ===
hCTR1 is upregulated in various cancer types, and it's associated with prognosis in several solid tumors. Atox1 and ATP7B were found to be important for Pt-based drug resistance. hCTR1 plays a role in oncology, hCTR1 facilitates uptake of platinum-based chemotherapeutic agents, such as cisplatin. Yeast and mammalian cells lacking CTR1 were resistant to cisplatin, while cells overexpressing CTR1 accumulated more of the drug. Tumor cells when exposed to cisplatin often react by increased degradation of hCTR1, thereby they become drug-resistant while simultaneously exhibiting signs of perturbed copper homeostasis. Studies of Atox1 in cancer cells demonstrated that this copper chaperone is crucial for cancer cell proliferation and survival. Small molecules targeting Atox1 have been proved to effectively block Cu-trafficking. For that reason reduce cell proliferation in lung, leukemia, breast, head, and neck cancer cell lines by elevating cellular ROS levels and reducing cellular NADPH and GSH levels. In contrast, healthy cells were barely affected by these small molecules.

== See also ==
- Solute carrier family
