= Menkes =

Menkes is a surname. Notable people with the surname include:

- John Menkes (1928– 2008), Austrian-American pediatric neurologist and author of fictional novels and plays
- Murray Menkes (died 2013), Canadian property developer
- Nina Menkes (born 1955), American women film director
- Suzy Menkes (born 1943), British fashion journalist

== See also ==
- Menkes disease, also known as Menkes syndrome, is an X-linked recessive disorder caused by mutations in genes coding for the copper-transport protein ATP7A, leading to copper deficiency
- Menke
