= Ceruloplasmin =

Mammalian protein found in Homo sapiens

CP
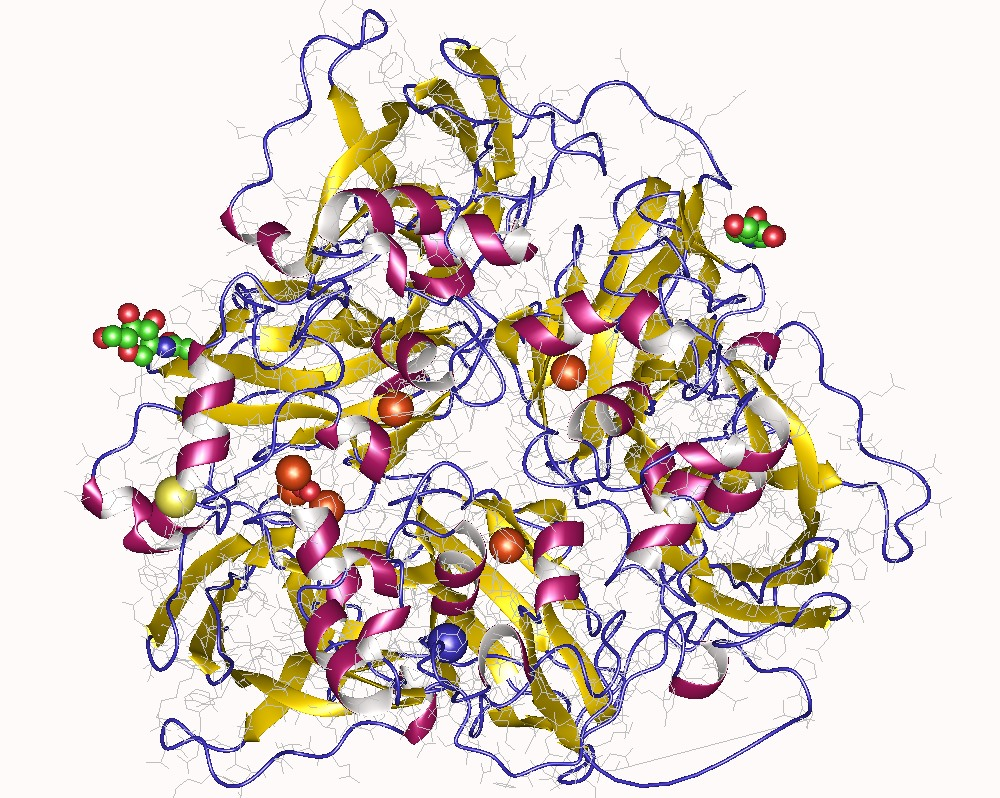

Identifiers
- Aliases: CP, CP-2, ceruloplasmin (ferroxidase), Ceruloplasmin, AB073614
- External IDs: OMIM: 117700; MGI: 88476; GeneCards: CP
Available structures
PDB	Ortholog search: PDBe RCSB
PDB	List of PDB id codes 1KCW, 2J5W, 4EJX, 4ENZ
Enzyme activity
EC #	BRENDA	ExPASy	KEGG	MetaCyc
1.11.1.9	↗	↗	↗	↗
1.11.1.27	↗	↗	↗	↗
1.16.3.1	↗	↗	↗	↗
1.16.3.4	↗	↗	↗	↗

Gene location (Human)
Chr.	Chromosome 3 (human)
Band	3q24-q25.1	Start	149,162,410 bp
Band	3q24-q25.1	End	149,221,829 bp

Gene location (Mouse)
Chr.	Chromosome 3 (mouse)
Band	3|3 A2	Start	20,011,218 bp
Band	3|3 A2	End	20,063,309 bp
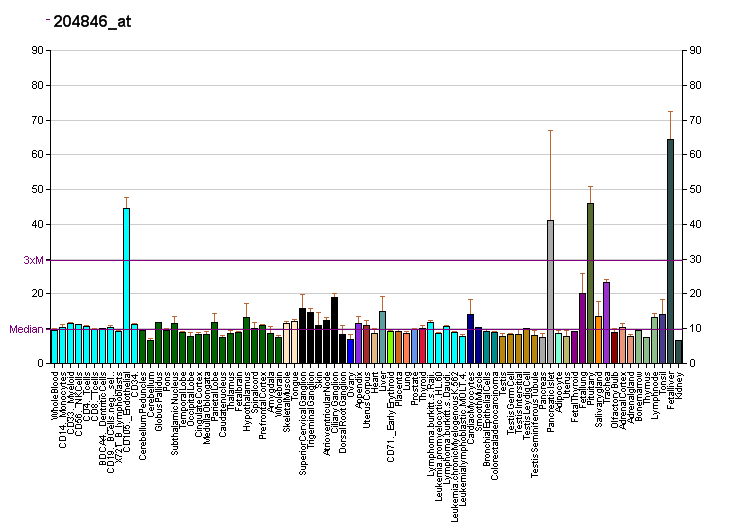
RNA expression pattern
Bgee	Human / Mouse (ortholog); Top expressed in: right lobe of liver; palpebral conjunctiva; nasal epithelium; olfactory zone of nasal mucosa; bronchial epithelial cell; mucosa of paranasal sinus; Epithelium of choroid plexus; ascending aorta; right coronary artery; tibial arteries / Top expressed in: left lobe of liver; epithelium of lens; ciliary body; carotid body; vestibular membrane of cochlear duct; lactiferous gland; tibiofemoral joint; right lung lobe; left lung; gallbladder; More reference expression data
BioGPS	More reference expression data
Gene ontology
Molecular function	chaperone binding; metal ion binding; ferroxidase activity; oxidoreductase activity; copper ion binding; oxidoreductase activity, acting on metal ions
Cellular component	blood microparticle; extracellular region; lysosomal membrane; extracellular exosome; extracellular space; endoplasmic reticulum lumen; plasma membrane
Biological process	ion transport; copper ion transport; cellular iron ion homeostasis; post-translational protein modification; transport; iron ion transport; iron ion homeostasis
Sources:Amigo / QuickGO
Orthologs
Databases	NCBI: entry; OMA: entry
Species	Human	Mouse
Entrez	1356	12870
Ensembl	ENSG00000047457	ENSMUSG00000003617
UniProt	P00450	Q61147
RefSeq (mRNA)	NM_000096	NM_001042611; NM_001276248; NM_001276250; NM_007752; NM_001374677
RefSeq (protein)	NP_000087	NP_001263177; NP_001263179; NP_031778; NP_001361606
Location (UCSC)	Chr 3: 149.16 – 149.22 Mb	Chr 3: 20.01 – 20.06 Mb
PubMed search
- Wikidata
View/Edit Human	View/Edit Mouse

Ceruloplasmin (or caeruloplasmin) is a ferroxidase enzyme that in humans is encoded by the CP gene.

Ceruloplasmin is the major copper-carrying protein in the blood, and in addition plays a role in iron metabolism. It was first described in 1948. Another protein, hephaestin, is noted for its homology to ceruloplasmin, and also participates in iron and probably copper metabolism.

== Function ==
Ceruloplasmin (CP) is an enzyme (EC 1.16.3.1) synthesized in the liver containing 6 atoms of copper in its structure. Ceruloplasmin carries more than 95% of the total copper in healthy human plasma. The rest is accounted for by macroglobulins. Ceruloplasmin exhibits a copper-dependent oxidase activity, which is associated with possible oxidation of Fe^{2+} (ferrous iron) into Fe^{3+} (ferric iron), therefore assisting in its transport in the plasma in association with transferrin, which can carry iron only in the ferric state. The molecular weight of human ceruloplasmin is reported to be 151kDa. Mutations have been known to disrupt the binding of copper to CP and will disrupt iron metabolism and cause an iron overload.

Ceruloplasmin is a relatively large enzyme (~10 nm); the larger size prevents the bound copper from being lost in a person's urine during transport.

== Active site structure ==
The multicopper active site of CP contains a type I (T1) mononuclear copper site and a trinuclear copper center distant by ca.12-13 Å. The tricopper center consists of two type III (T3) coppers and one type II (T2) copper ion. The two T3 copper ions are bridged by a hydroxide ligand while another hydroxide ligand links the T2 copper ion to the protein. The T1 center is bridged to the tricopper center by two histidine (His1020, His1022) residues and one Cys(1021) residue. The substrate binds near the T1 center and is oxidized by the T1 Cu^{2+} ion forming the reduced Cu^{+} oxidation state. The reduced T1 Cu^{+} then transfers the electron through the one Cys and two His bridging residues to the tricopper center. After four electrons have been transferred from the substrates to the copper centers, an O_{2} binds at the tricopper center and undergoes a four-electron reduction to form two molecules of water.

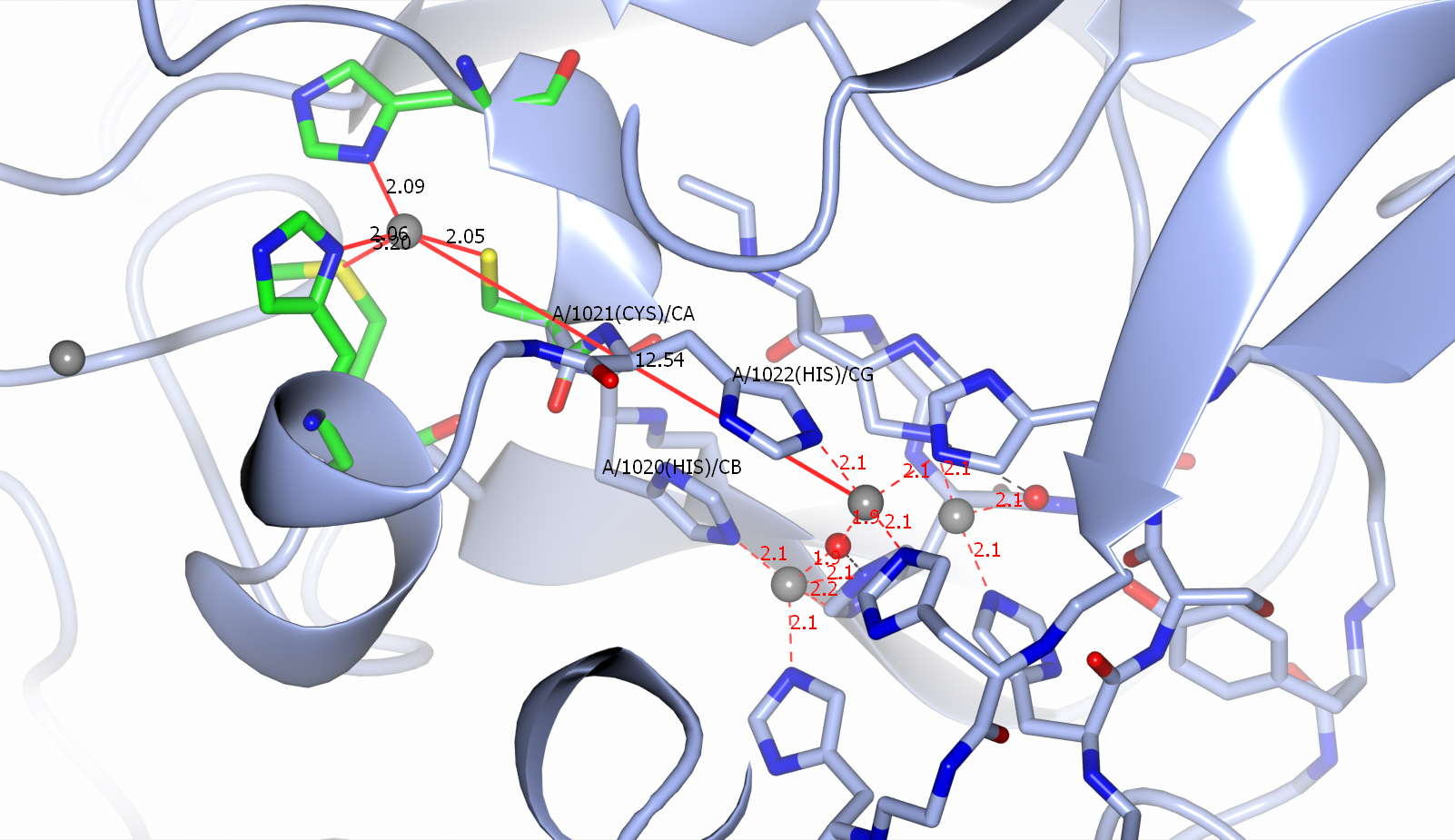
Figure 2: Close-up view of the human plasma CP active site consisting of the T1 copper center (left) and trinuclear copper center (right) showing the coordinating side chains. PDB code: 1KCW. Atom colors: Cu = grey; O = red; N = blue; S = yellow.

== Regulation ==
A cis-regulatory element called the GAIT element is involved in the selective translational silencing of the Ceruloplasmin transcript. The silencing requires binding of a cytosolic inhibitor complex called IFN-gamma-activated inhibitor of translation (GAIT) to the GAIT element.

== Clinical significance ==
Like any other plasma protein, levels drop in patients with hepatic disease due to reduced synthesizing capabilities.

Mechanisms of low ceruloplasmin levels:

- Gene expression genetically low (aceruloplasminemia)
- Copper levels are low in general
  - Malnutrition/trace metal deficiency in the food source
  - Zinc toxicity, due to induced copper deficiency
- Copper does not cross the intestinal barrier due to ATP7A deficiency (Menkes disease and Occipital horn syndrome)
- Delivery of copper into the lumen of the ER-Golgi network is absent in hepatocytes due to absent ATP7B (Wilson's disease)

=== Deficiency ===
Lower-than-normal ceruloplasmin levels may indicate the following:

- Wilson disease (a rare [UK incidence 2/100,000] copper storage disease).
- Menkes disease (Menkes kinky hair syndrome) (rare – UK incidence 1/100,000)
- Copper deficiency
- Aceruloplasminemia
- Zinc toxicity

=== Excess ===
Greater-than-normal ceruloplasmin levels may indicate or be noticed in:

- copper toxicity / zinc deficiency
- pregnancy
- oral contraceptive pill use
- lymphoma
- acute and chronic inflammation (it is an acute-phase reactant)
- rheumatoid arthritis
- Angina
- Alzheimer's disease
- Schizophrenia
- Obsessive-compulsive disorder

=== Reference ranges ===
Normal blood concentration of ceruloplasmin in humans is 20–50 mg/dL.

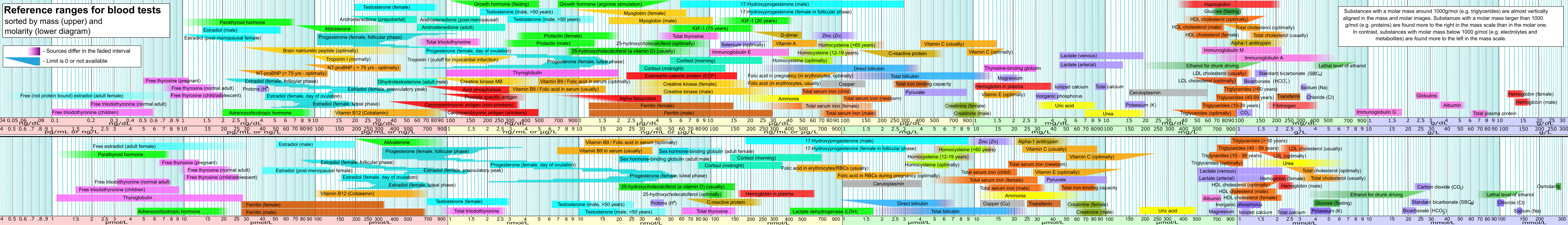
Reference ranges for blood tests, comparing blood content of ceruloplasmin (shown in gray) with other constituents.
