= Asociación Corriendo con el Corazón por Hugo =

Nonprofit organization in Spain

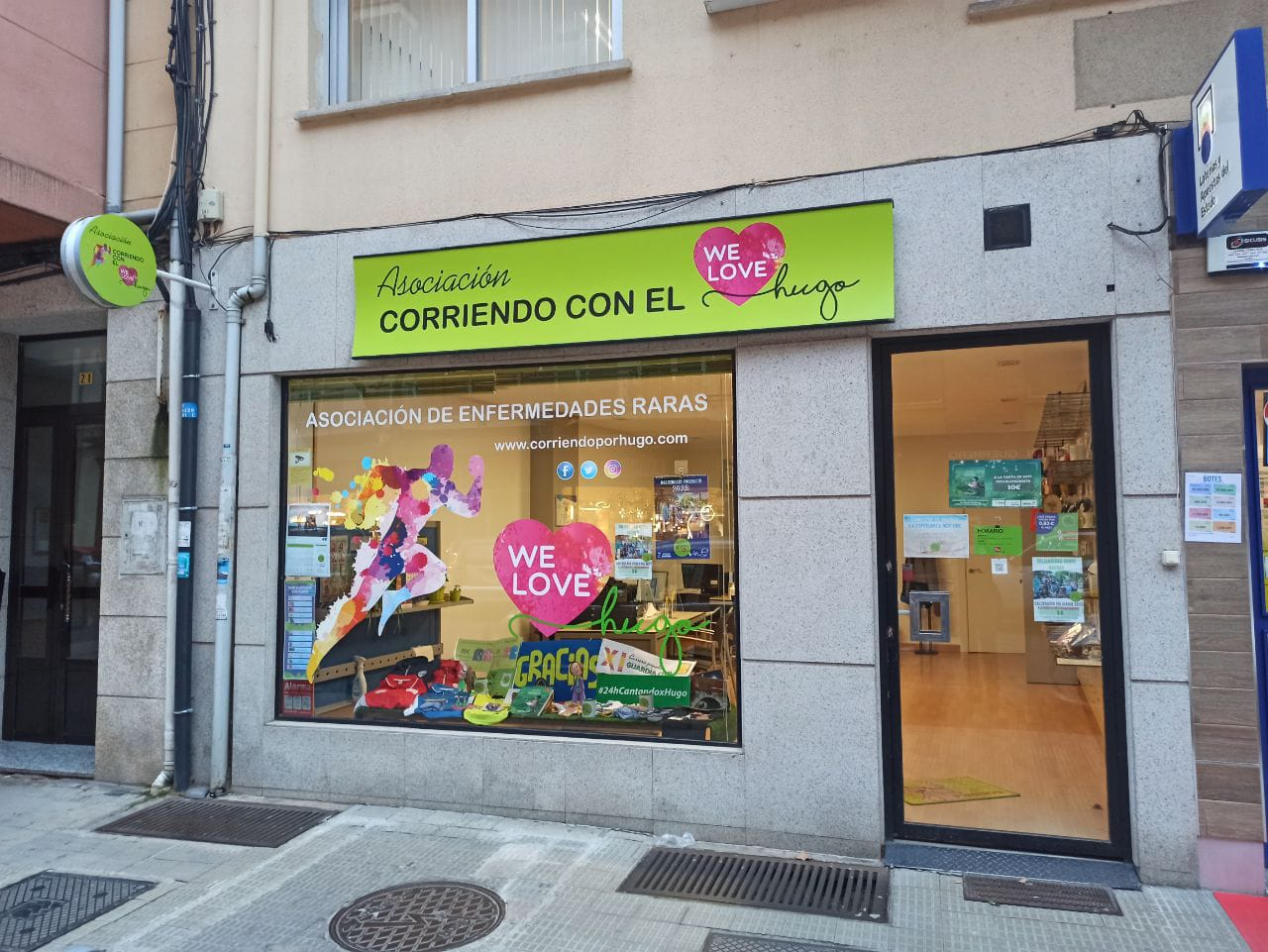
- Asociación Corriendo con el Corazón por Hugo in 2023
- Abbreviation: Corriendo por Hugo
- Formation: 30 April 2017; 9 years ago
- Type: nonprofit organization
- Purpose: rare diseases
- Location: Avenida Víctor Gallego N° 23, 49.009, Zamora, Spain
- Region served: Spain
- Official language: Spanish
- Director: Raúl Vara Ferrero
- Affiliations: Federación Española de Enfermedades Raras
- Website: corriendoporhugo.com

The Asociación Corriendo con el Corazón por Hugo (translated in English: Association Running with the Heart for Hugo), also Corriendo por Hugo is a nonprofit organization serving Spanish volunteers.

It is a civil association with legal personality CIF G49295686, apolitical and religious, which works in an organized way.

It was created on 30 April 2017, a symbolic date when the Hug will not give birth to the association that will die at 18 months of a rare genetic malady, Menkes disease. Hugh's parents, Eva and Raul Boizas Macías will create an association in their name which collects money for research on rare diseases, at the initiative of our seniors to contribute again at their times.

During the COVID-19 pandemic, the association suffered a decrease in resources due to the cancellation of its activities. For this reason, the deputation of Zamora published a solidarity book titled Antologia para la esperanza, whose objective was to help the association financially. The collection obtained through the sale of the book was given entirely to the association.

The current director of the organization is Raúl Vara Ferrero.
