= Copper deficiency =

Insufficient level of copper in the body, leading to anaemia and nervous symptoms

- Other names: Hypocupremia
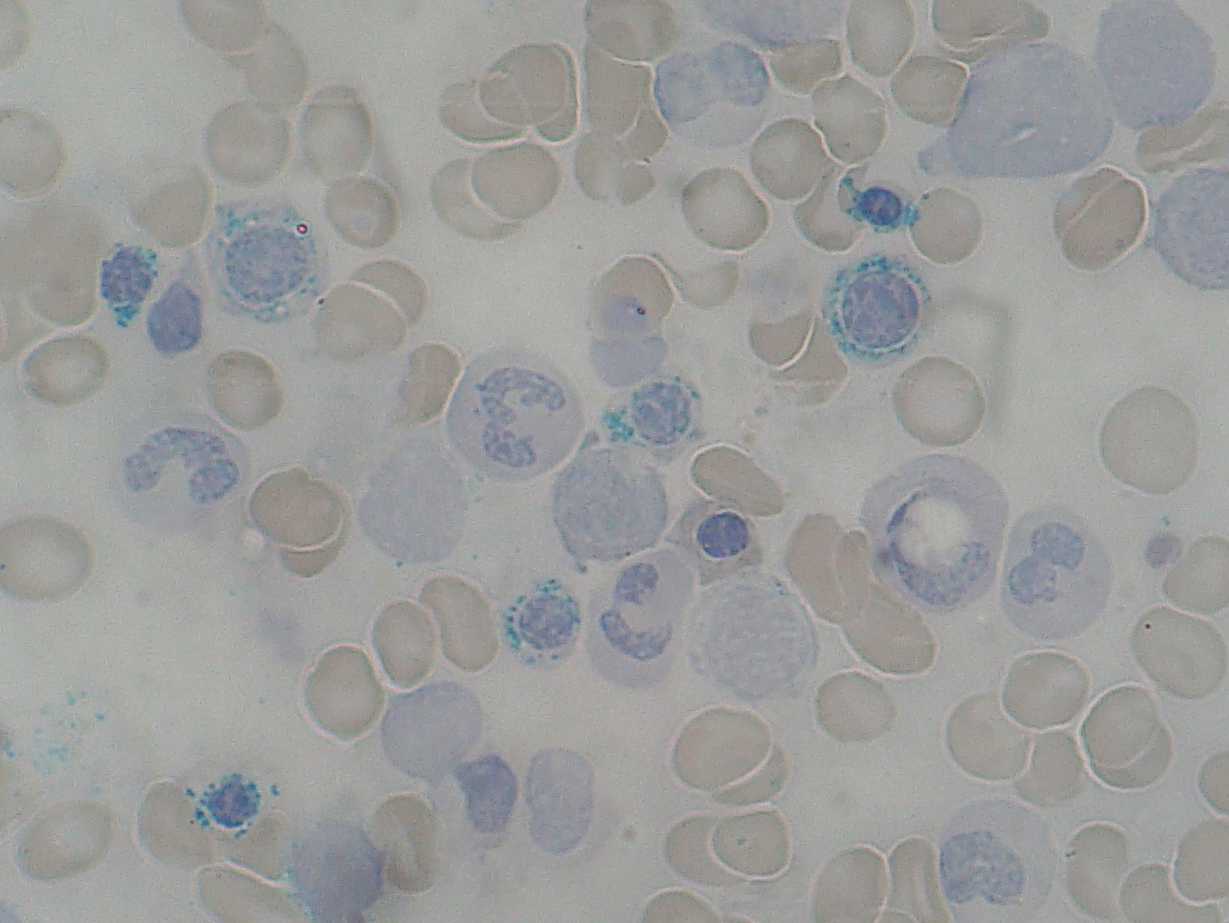
- Ring Sideroblast smear, a sign of copper deficiency in the blood.
- Specialty: Endocrinology
- Risk factors: Alcoholism, gastric bypass surgery

Copper deficiency, or hypocupremia, is defined as insufficient copper to meet the body's needs, or as a serum copper level below the normal range. Symptoms may include fatigue, decreased red blood cells, early greying of the hair, and neurological problems presenting as numbness, tingling, muscle weakness, and ataxia. The neurodegenerative syndrome of copper deficiency has been recognized for some time in ruminant animals, in which it is commonly known as "swayback". Copper deficiency can manifest in parallel with vitamin B12 and other nutritional deficiencies.

== Overview ==
The most common cause of copper deficiency is a remote gastrointestinal surgery, such as gastric bypass surgery, due to malabsorption of copper, or zinc toxicity. On the other hand, Menkes disease is a genetic disorder of copper deficiency involving a wide variety of symptoms that is often fatal.

Copper is required for the functioning of many enzymes, such as cytochrome c oxidase, which is complex IV in the mitochondrial electron transport chain, ceruloplasmin, Cu/Zn superoxide dismutase, and in amine oxidases. These enzymes catalyze reactions for oxidative phosphorylation, iron transportation, antioxidant and free radical scavenging and neutralization, and neurotransmitter synthesis, respectively. Diets vary in the amount of copper they contain, but may provide about 5 mg/day, of which only 20-50% is absorbed. The diet of the elderly may have a lower copper content than the recommended daily intake. Dietary copper can be found in whole grain cereals, legumes, oysters, organ meats (particularly liver), cherries, dark chocolate, fruits, leafy green vegetables, nuts, poultry, prunes, and soybean products like tofu.

Copper deficiency can have many hematological consequences, such as myelodysplasia, anemia, low white blood cell count, and low count of neutrophils (a type of white blood cell that is often called "the first line of defense" of the immune system).

== Signs and symptoms ==
=== Blood symptoms ===
The characteristic hematological (blood) effects of copper deficiency are anemia (which may be microcytic, normocytic or macrocytic) and neutropenia. Thrombocytopenia (low blood platelets) is unusual.

The peripheral blood and bone marrow aspirate findings in copper deficiency can mimic myelodysplastic syndrome. Bone marrow aspirate in both conditions may show dysplasia of blood cell precursors and the presence of ring sideroblasts (erythroblasts containing multiple iron granules around the nucleus). Unlike most cases of myelodysplastic syndrome, the bone marrow aspirate in copper deficiency characteristically shows cytoplasmic vacuoles within red and white cell precursors, and karyotyping in cases of copper deficiency does not reveal cytogenetic features characteristic of myelodysplastic syndrome.

Anemia and neutropenia typically resolve within six weeks of copper replacement.

=== Neurological symptoms ===
Copper deficiency can cause a wide variety of neurological problems including myelopathy, peripheral neuropathy, and optic neuropathy.

==== Myelopathy ====
Copper deficiency myelopathy in humans was discovered and first described by Schleper and Stuerenburg in 2001. They described a patient with a history of gastrectomy and partial colonic resection who presented with severe tetraparesis and painful paraesthesias and who was found on imaging to have dorsomedial cervical cord T2 hyperintensity. Upon further analysis, it was found that the patient had decreased levels of serum coeruloplasmin, serum copper, and CSF copper. The patient was treated with parenteral copper and the patient's paraesthesias did resolve. Since this discovery, awareness of copper-deficiency myelopathy and its treatment has increased. Patients typically present difficulty walking (gait difficulty) caused by sensory ataxia (irregular muscle coordination) due to dorsal column dysfunction or degeneration of the spinal cord (myelopathy). Patients with ataxic gait have problems balancing and display an unstable wide walk. They often feel tremors in their torso, causing sideways jerks and lunges.

In brain MRI, there is often an increased T2 signalling at the posterior columns of the spinal cord in patients with myelopathy caused by copper deficiency. T2 signalling is often an indicator of neurodegeneration. There are some changes in the spinal cord MRI involving the thoracic cord, the cervical cord, or sometimes both. Copper deficiency myelopathy is often compared to subacute combined degeneration (SCD). Subacute combined degeneration is also a degeneration of the spinal cord, but instead vitamin B12 deficiency is the cause of the spinal degeneration. SCD also has the same high T2 signalling intensities in the posterior column as copper deficient patient in MRI imaging.

==== Peripheral neuropathy ====
Another common symptom of copper deficiency is peripheral neuropathy, which is numbness or tingling that can start in the extremities and can sometimes progress radially inward towards the torso. In an Advances in Clinical Neuroscience & Rehabilitation published case report, a 69-year-old patient had progressively worsened neurological symptoms. These symptoms included diminished upper limb reflexes with abnormal lower limb reflexes, sensation to light touch and pin prick was diminished above the waist, vibration sensation was lost in the sternum, and markedly reduced proprioception or sensation about the self's orientation. Many people with the neurological effects of copper deficiency complain about very similar or identical symptoms as the patient. This numbness and tingling pose a danger for the elderly because it increases their risk of falling and injuring themselves. Peripheral neuropathy can become very disabling leaving some patients reliant on wheelchairs or walking canes for mobility if there is a lack of correct diagnosis. Rarely can copper deficiency cause major disabling symptoms. The deficiency must be present for an extensive amount of time until such disabling conditions manifest.

==== Optic neuropathy ====
Some patients with copper deficiency have shown signs of vision and color loss. The vision is usually lost in the peripheral views of the eye. The bilateral vision loss is usually very gradual. An optical coherence tomography (OCT) shows some nerve fiber layer loss in most patients, suggesting the vision loss and color vision loss was secondary to optic neuropathy or neurodegeneration.

== Causes ==
=== Surgery ===
Bariatric surgery is a common cause of copper deficiency. Bariatric surgery, such as gastric bypass surgery, is often used for weight control of the morbidly obese. The disruption of the intestines and stomach from the surgery can cause absorption difficulties not only as regards copper but also for iron and vitamin B12 and many other nutrients. The symptoms of copper deficiency myelopathy may take up to decades to develop.

=== Zinc toxicity ===
Increased zinc consumption is another cause of copper deficiency. Zinc is often used for the prevention or treatment of common colds and sinusitis (inflammation of sinuses due to an infection), ulcers, sickle cell disease, celiac disease, memory impairment, and acne. Zinc is found in many common vitamin supplements and is also found in denture creams. Recently, several cases of copper deficiency myeloneuropathy were found to be caused by prolonged use of denture creams containing high quantities of zinc.

Metallic zinc is the core of all United States currency coins, including copper-coated pennies. People who ingest many coins will have elevated zinc levels, leading to zinc-toxicity-induced copper deficiency and the associated neurological symptoms. This was the case for a 57-year-old woman diagnosed with schizophrenia. The woman consumed over 600 coins and started to show neurological symptoms such as unsteady gait and mild ataxia.

=== Hereditary disorders ===
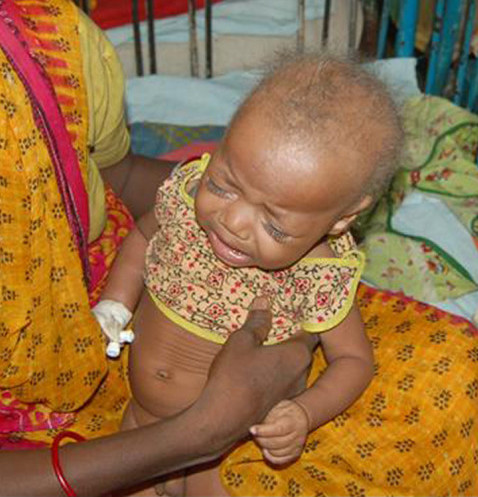
Menkes disease showing symptoms of the sparse, steel colored "kinky hair" and paleness

Menkes disease is a congenital disease that is a cause of copper deficiency. Menkes disease is a hereditary condition caused by a defective gene involved with the metabolism of copper in the body. Menkes disease has a wide variety of symptoms including floppy muscle tone, seizures, abnormally low body temperature, and a peculiar steel color hair that feels very rough. Menkes disease is usually fatal, with the majority of affected children dying within the first ten years of life.

=== Other ===
It is rarely suggested that excess iron supplementation causes copper deficiency myelopathy. Another rarer cause of copper deficiency is celiac disease, probably due to malabsorption in the intestines. Still, a large percentage, around 20%, of cases have unknown causes.

== Pathophysiology ==
Copper functions as a prosthetic group, permitting electron transfers in key enzymatic pathways like the electron transport chain. Copper is integrated in the enzymes cytochrome c oxidase, which is involved in cellular respiration and oxidative phosphorylation, Cu/Zn dismutase, which is involved in antioxidant defense, and many more listed in the table below.

Several Copper Dependent Enzymes and Their Function
Group	Enzyme	Function
Oxidases	Flavin-containing amine oxidase	Metabolism of neurotransmitters: noradrenaline, dopamine, serotonin and some dietary amines
	Protein-lysine-6-oxidase (lysyl oxidase)	Connective tissue synthesis- cross-linking of collagen and elastin
	Copper-containing amine oxidase (a family of enzymes which includes primary-amine oxidase and diamine oxidase)	Oxidation of biogenic amines including neurotransmitters, histamines, putrescine, cadaverine, and xenobiotic amines
	Cytochrome c oxidase	Oxidative phosphorylation, electron transport in the mitochondrial membrane
	Superoxide dismutase (Cu/Zn dismutase)	Antioxidant and free radical scavenger, oxidizes dangerous superoxides to safer hydrogen peroxide
	Ferroxidase I (ceruloplasmin)	Iron transport-oxidation of Fe^{2+} to Fe^{3+}, copper storage and transport, antioxidant and free radical neutralizer
	Hephaestin (ferroxidase)	Iron transport and oxidation of Fe^{2+} to Fe^{3+} in intestinal cells to enable iron uptake
Monooxygenases	Dopamine beta-monooxygenase	Conversion of dopamine to norepinephrine
	Peptidylglycine monooxygenase	Peptide hormone maturation- amidation of alpha-terminal carboxylic acid group of glycine
	Monophenol monooxygenase (Tyrosinase)	Melanin synthesis
Methylation Cycle	Methionine synthase	Transfer of methyl group from methyltetrahydrofolate to homocysteine to generate methionine for the methylation cycle and tetrahydrofolate for purine synthesis
	Adenosylhomocysteinase (S-Adenosyl-L-homocysteine)	Regeneration of homocysteine from adenosylhomocyesteine (S-Adenosyl-L-homocysteine) in the methylation cycle

=== Neurological ===
Cytochrome c Oxidase mechanism in mitochondrial membrane

==== Cytochrome c oxidase ====
There have been several hypotheses about the role of copper and some of its neurological manifestations. Some suggest that disruptions in cytochrome c oxidase, also known as Complex IV, of the electron transport chain, is responsible for spinal cord degeneration.

==== Methylation cycle ====
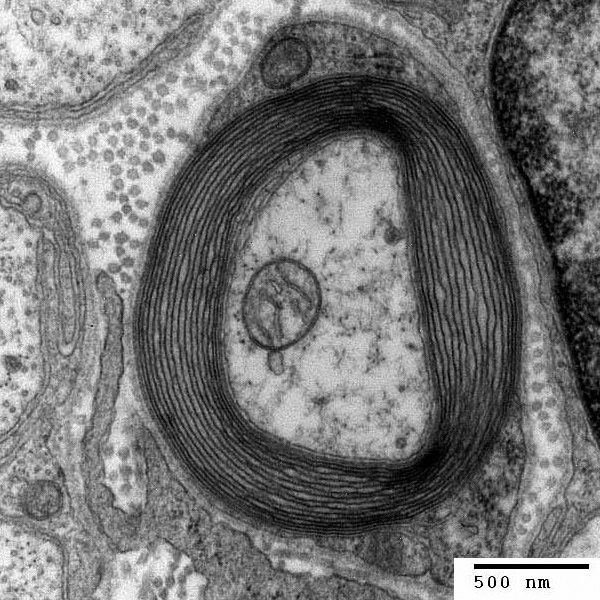
Myelinated neuron

Another hypothesis is that copper deficiency myelopathy is caused by disruptions in the methylation cycle. The methylation cycle causes a transfer of a methyl group (-CH_{3}) from methyltetrahydrofolate to a range of macromolecules by the suspected copper-dependent enzyme methionine synthase. This cycle is able to produce purines, which are a component of DNA nucleotide bases, and also myelin proteins. The spinal cord is surrounded by a layer of protective protein coating called myelin (see figure). When this methionine synthase enzyme is disrupted, the methylation decreases and myelination of the spinal cord is impaired. This cycle ultimately causes myelopathy.

=== Hematological cause ===
==== Iron transportation ====
The anemia caused by copper deficiency is thought to be caused by impaired iron transport. Hephaestin is a copper-containing ferroxidase enzyme located in the duodenal mucosa that oxidizes iron and facilitates its transfer across the basolateral membrane into circulation. Another iron transporting enzyme is ceruloplasmin. This enzyme is required to mobilize iron from the reticuloendothelial cell to plasma. Ceruloplasmin also oxidizes iron from its ferrous state to the ferric form required for iron binding. Impairment in these copper-dependent enzymes that transport iron may cause secondary iron deficiency anemia. Another speculation for the cause of anaemia involves the mitochondrial enzyme cytochrome c oxidase (complex IV in the electron transport chain). Studies have shown that animal models with impaired cytochrome c oxidase failed to synthesize heme from ferric iron at the normal rate. The lower rate of the enzyme might also cause the excess iron to clump, giving the haeme an unusual pattern. This unusual pattern is also known as ringed sideroblastic anemia cells.

==== Cell growth halt ====
The cause of neutropenia is still unclear; however, the arrest of maturing myelocytes, or neutrophil precursors, may cause the neutrophil deficiency.

==== Zinc intoxication ====
Zinc intoxication may cause anemia by blocking the absorption of copper from the stomach and duodenum. Zinc also upregulates the expression of chelator metallothionein in enterocytes, which are the majority of cells in the intestinal epithelium. Since copper has a higher affinity for metallothionein than zinc, the copper will remain bound inside the enterocyte, which will be later eliminated through the lumen. This mechanism is exploited therapeutically to achieve negative balance in Wilson's disease, which involves an excess of copper. But in copper-deficient individuals, zinc excess may cause this mechanism to further deplete copper levels.

== Diagnosis ==
The diagnosis of copper deficiency may be supported by a person's report of compatible signs and symptoms, findings from a thorough physical examination, and supportive laboratory evidence. Low levels of copper and ceruloplasmin in the serum are consistent with the diagnosis as is a low 24-hour urine copper level. Additional supportive bloodwork findings also include neutropenia and anemia. MRI imaging may demonstrate increased T2 signal of the dorsal column–medial lemniscus pathways.

== Treatment ==
Copper deficiency is a very rare disease and is often misdiagnosed several times by physicians before concluding the deficiency of copper through differential diagnosis (copper serum test and bone marrow biopsy are usually conclusive in diagnosing copper deficiency). On average, patients are diagnosed with copper deficiency around 1.1 years after their first symptoms are reported to a physician. Copper deficiency can be treated with either oral copper supplementation or intravenous copper. If zinc intoxication is present, discontinuation of zinc may be sufficient to restore copper levels to normal, but this usually is a very slow process. People with zinc intoxication will usually have to take copper supplements in addition to ceasing zinc consumption. Hematological manifestations are often quickly restored to normal. The progression of the neurological symptoms will be stopped and sometimes improved with appropriate treatment, but residual neurological disability is common.

== See also ==
- Copper in health
- Copper deficiency and excess health conditions (non-genetic)
