= Cu2+-exporting ATPase =

Cu^{2+}-exporting ATPase

Identifiers
- EC no.: 3.6.3.4

Databases
- IntEnz: IntEnz view
- BRENDA: BRENDA entry
- ExPASy: NiceZyme view
- KEGG: KEGG entry
- MetaCyc: metabolic pathway
- PRIAM: profile
- PDB structures: RCSB PDB PDBe PDBsum
Search
- PMC: articles
- PubMed: articles
- NCBI: proteins

Cu^{2+}-exporting ATPase (EC 3.6.3.4) is an enzyme with systematic name ATP phosphohydrolase (Cu^{2+}-exporting). This enzyme catalyses the following chemical reaction

ATP + H_{2}O + Cu^{2+}_{in} $\rightleftharpoons$ ADP + phosphate + Cu^{2+}_{out}

This P-type ATPase undergoes covalent phosphorylation during the transport cycle.

== See also ==
- ATP7A
