= Menke =

Menke is a German surname. Notable people with the surname include:

- Amy Menke (born 1995), American ice hockey player
- Anne Menke (born 1967), German photographer
- Bill Menke (1918–1945), American basketball player
- Carl Menke (1906–?), German field hockey player
- Denis Menke (1940–2020), American baseball player
- Frank G. Menke (1885–1954), American newspaper reporter
- Frl. Menke (born 1960), German singer
- George Menke (died 1978), American football player and coach
- Heinrich Theodor Menke (1819–1892) German geographer
- Johannes Menke (born 1972), German musicologist
- Karl Theodor Menke (1791–1861), German malacologist
- Ken Menke (1922–2002), American basketball player
- Lester Menke (1918–2016), American politician
- Richard-Hyde Menke (born 1985), Nauruan politician
- Richard J. Menke (1935–2006), American lawyer and politician
- Sally Menke (1953–2010), American film editor
- Sebastian Menke (1910–2002), American Catholic priest and academic administrator

== See also ==
- Menke Katz (1906–1991), Russian–American poet and writer
- Menkes
- Menke condition nitration method discovered by a Dutch chemist
- Retainers in early China (social group), also known as menke
