= ATOX1 =

Protein-coding gene in the species Homo sapiens

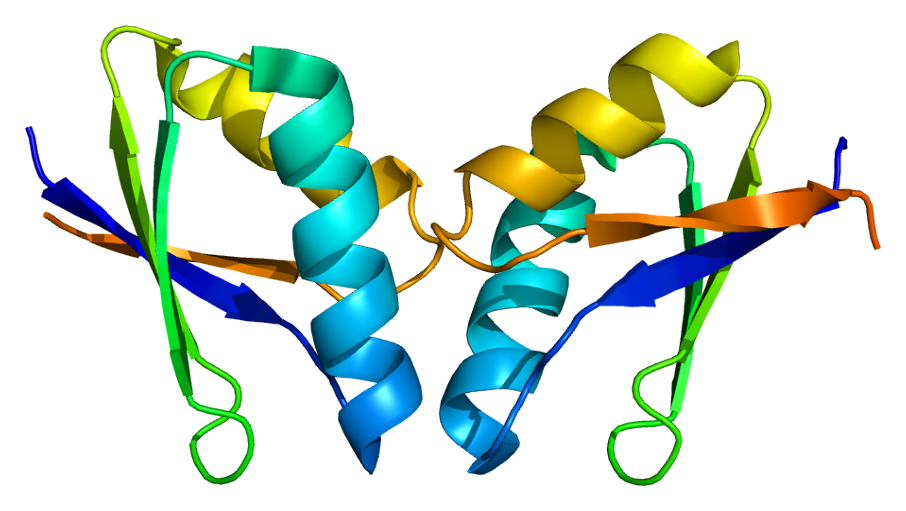

Identifiers
- Aliases: ATOX1, ATX1, HAH1, antioxidant 1 copper chaperone
- External IDs: OMIM: 602270; MGI: 1333855; GeneCards: ATOX1
Available structures
| PDB | Ortholog search: PDBe RCSB |
| PDB | List of PDB id codes 1FE0, 1FE4, 1FEE, 1TL4, 1TL5, 2K1R, 2LQ9, 3CJK, 3IWL, 3IWX, 4QOT, 4YDX, 4YEA |

Gene location (Human)
| Chr. | Chromosome 5 (human) |
| Band | 5q33.1 | Start | 151,742,316 bp |
| Band | 5q33.1 | End | 151,772,532 bp |

Gene location (Mouse)
| Chr. | Chromosome 11 (mouse) |
| Band | 11 B1.3|11 33.07 cM | Start | 55,337,467 bp |
| Band | 11 B1.3|11 33.07 cM | End | 55,352,065 bp |
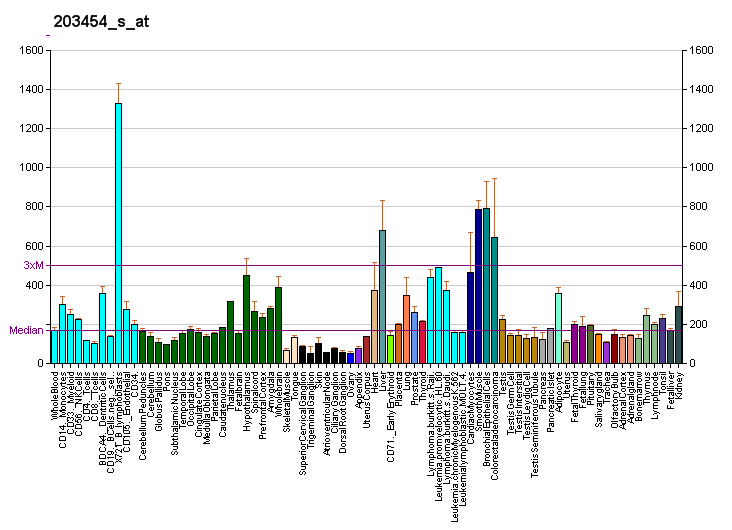
RNA expression pattern
| Bgee | Human / Mouse (ortholog); Top expressed in: C1 segment; right lobe of liver; right adrenal gland; right adrenal cortex; left adrenal cortex; left lobe of thyroid gland; stromal cell of endometrium; right lobe of thyroid gland; olfactory zone of nasal mucosa; left coronary artery / Top expressed in: yolk sac; right kidney; choroid plexus of fourth ventricle; lip; embryo; olfactory epithelium; hair follicle; skin of abdomen; left lobe of liver; esophagus; More reference expression data |
| BioGPS | More reference expression data |
Gene ontology
| Molecular function | copper ion transmembrane transporter activity; metallochaperone activity; copper ion binding; protein binding; copper chaperone activity; copper-dependent protein binding; metal ion binding; ATPase binding |
| Cellular component | cytosol |
| Biological process | metal ion transport; copper ion transport; ion transport; protein maturation by copper ion transfer; copper ion transmembrane transport; cellular copper ion homeostasis; response to oxidative stress; negative regulation of apoptotic process; copper ion export |
Sources:Amigo / QuickGO
Orthologs
| Databases | NCBI: entry; OMA: entry |
| Species | Human | Mouse |
| Entrez | 475 | 11927 |
| Ensembl | ENSG00000177556 | ENSMUSG00000018585 |
| UniProt | O00244 | O08997 |
| RefSeq (mRNA) | NM_004045 | NM_009720 |
| RefSeq (protein) | NP_004036 | NP_033850 |
| Location (UCSC) | Chr 5: 151.74 – 151.77 Mb | Chr 11: 55.34 – 55.35 Mb |
| PubMed search |
- Wikidata
| View/Edit Human | View/Edit Mouse |

ATOX1 is a copper metallochaperone protein that is encoded by the ATOX1 gene in humans. In mammals, ATOX1 plays a key role in copper homeostasis as it delivers copper from the cytosol to transporters ATP7A and ATP7B. Homologous proteins are found in a wide variety of eukaryotes, including Saccharomyces cerevisiae as ATX1, and all contain a conserved metal binding domain.

== Function ==
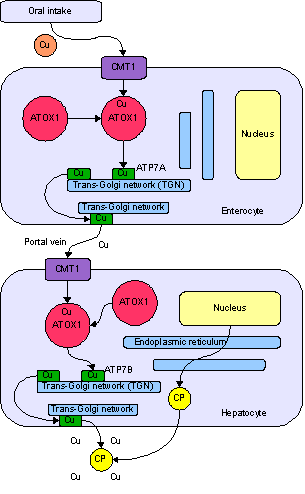
Schematic of copper homeostasis cell biology

ATOX1 is an abbreviation of the full name Antioxidant Protein 1. The nomenclature stems from initial characterization that showed that ATOX1 protected cells from reactive oxygen species. Since then, the primary role of ATOX1 has been established as a copper metallochaperone protein found in the cytoplasm of eukaryotes. A metallochaperone is an important protein that has metal trafficking and sequestration roles. As a metal sequestration protein, ATOX1 is capable of binding free metals in vivo, in order to protect cells from generation of reactive oxygen species and mismetallation of metalloproteins. As a metal trafficking protein, ATOX1 is responsible for shuttling copper from the cytosol to ATPase transporters ATP7A and ATP7B that move copper to the trans-Golgi network or secretory vesicles. In Saccharomyces cerevisiae, Atx1 delivers Cu(I) to a homologous transporter, Ccc2. The delivery of copper to ATPase transporters is vital for the subsequent insertion of copper into ceruloplasmin, a ferroxidase required for iron metabolism, within the golgi apparatus. In addition to the metallochaperone function, recent reports have characterized ATOX1 as a cyclin D1 transcription factor.

== Structure & metal coordination ==
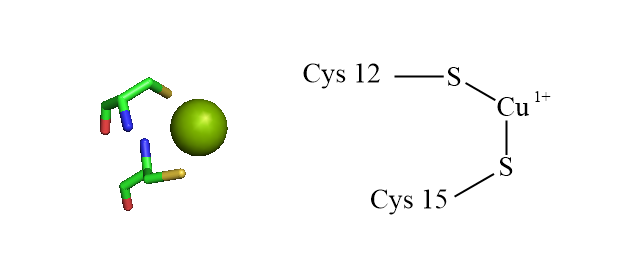
ATOX1 copper coordination

ATOX1 has a ferredoxin-like βαββαβ fold and coordinates to Cu(I) via a MXCXXC binding motif located in between the first β-sheet and α-helix. The metal binding motif is largely solvent exposed in Apo-ATOX1 and a conformational change is induced upon coordination to Cu(I). Cu(I) is coordinated in a distorted linear geometry to sulfurs of cystine to form a bond angle of 120°. The overall -1 charge of the primary coordination sphere is stabilized through the secondary coordination sphere that contains a proximal positively charged lysine. ATOX1 also binds Hg(II), Cd(II), Ag(I), and cisplatin via this motif, but a physiological role, if any, is not yet known.

== Metal transfer ==
Model of ligand exchange copper transfer from Atx1 to Ccc2

ATOX1 transfers Cu(I) to transporters ATP7A and ATP7B. Transfer occurs via a ligand exchange mechanism, where Cu(I) transiently adopts a 3-coordinate geometry with cysteine ligands from ATOX1 and the associated transporter. The ligand exchange mechanism allows for faster exchange than a diffusion mechanism and imparts specificity for both the metal and transporter. Since the ligand exchange accelerates that transfer and the reaction has a shallow thermodynamic gradient, it is said to be under kinetic control rather than thermodynamic control.

== Clinical significance ==
Although there are presently no known diseases directly associated with ATOX1 malfunction, there is currently active research in a few areas:

- There is a link between ATOX1 levels and sensitivity of cells for Pt-based drugs like cisplatin.
- The mechanism of ammonium tetrathiomolybdate [NH_{4}]_{2}MoS_{4} treatment of Wilson's Disease is under review. Since ATOX1 forms a stable complex tetrathiomolybdate, it is being studied as the potential therapeutic target.
