= Wilson disease protein =

Mammalian protein found in humans

ATP7B
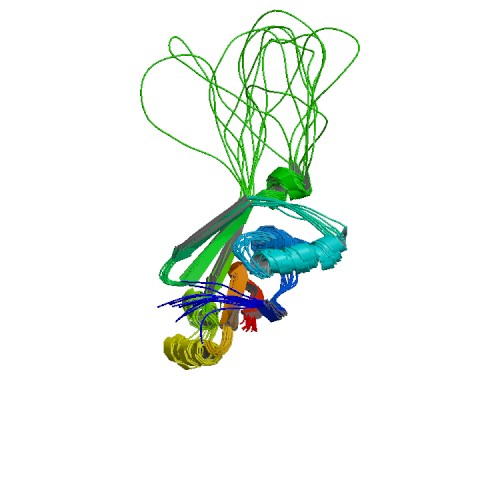

Identifiers
- Aliases: ATP7B, PWD, WC1, WD, WND, ATPase copper transporting beta
- External IDs: OMIM: 606882; MGI: 103297; GeneCards: ATP7B
Available structures
| PDB | Ortholog search: PDBe RCSB |
| PDB | List of PDB id codes 2ROP, 2EW9, 2KOY, 2LQB |
Enzyme activity
| EC # | BRENDA | ExPASy | KEGG | MetaCyc |
|---|---|---|---|---|
| 7.2.2.8 | ↗ | ↗ | ↗ | ↗ |

Gene location (Human)
| Chr. | Chromosome 13 (human) |
| Band | 13q14.3 | Start | 51,930,436 bp |
| Band | 13q14.3 | End | 52,012,125 bp |

Gene location (Mouse)
| Chr. | Chromosome 8 (mouse) |
| Band | 8 A2|8 10.78 cM | Start | 22,482,801 bp |
| Band | 8 A2|8 10.78 cM | End | 22,550,321 bp |
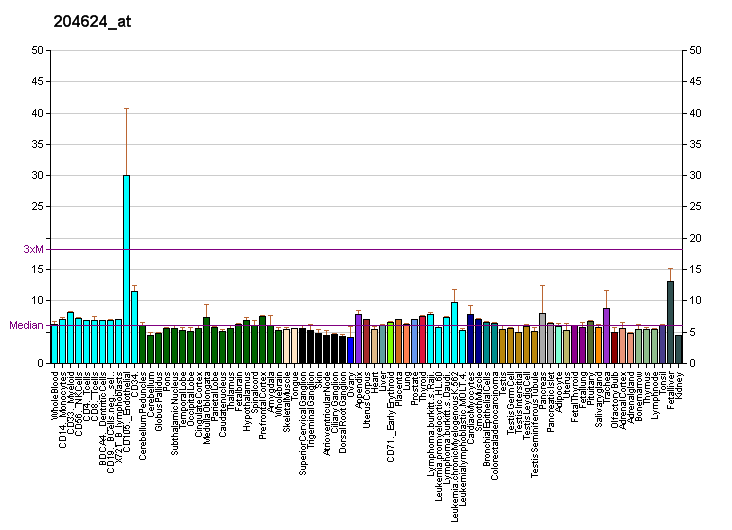
RNA expression pattern
| Bgee | Human / Mouse (ortholog); Top expressed in: nasal epithelium; right testis; left testis; olfactory zone of nasal mucosa; jejunal mucosa; right lobe of liver; germinal epithelium; gonad; testicle; right hemisphere of cerebellum / Top expressed in: yolk sac; pharynx; gastrula; lumbar subsegment of spinal cord; urethra; right lung; right lung lobe; submandibular gland; left lung lobe; respiratory epithelium; More reference expression data |
| BioGPS | More reference expression data |
Gene ontology
| Molecular function | nucleotide binding; metal ion binding; P-type divalent copper transporter activity; ATPase-coupled cation transmembrane transporter activity; protein binding; copper ion binding; hydrolase activity; ATP binding; copper ion transmembrane transporter activity |
| Cellular component | cytoplasm; integral component of membrane; trans-Golgi network membrane; membrane; Golgi membrane; integral component of plasma membrane; trans-Golgi network; basolateral plasma membrane; mitochondrion; perinuclear region of cytoplasm; endosome; late endosome; Golgi apparatus; cytoplasmic vesicle |
| Biological process | protein maturation by copper ion transfer; copper ion transmembrane transport; metal ion transport; copper ion import; cation transport; ion transport; copper ion export; ion transmembrane transport; sequestering of calcium ion; cellular zinc ion homeostasis; cellular copper ion homeostasis; lactation; response to copper ion; copper ion transport; transport |
Sources:Amigo / QuickGO
Orthologs
| Databases | NCBI: entry; OMA: entry |
| Species | Human | Mouse |
| Entrez | 540 | 11979 |
| Ensembl | ENSG00000123191 | ENSMUSG00000006567 |
| UniProt | P35670 | Q64446 |
| RefSeq (mRNA) | NM_000053; NM_001005918; NM_001243182; NM_001330578; NM_001330579 | NM_007511 |
| RefSeq (protein) | NP_000044; NP_001005918; NP_001230111; NP_001317507; NP_001317508 NP_000044.2; NP_000044.2; NP_001005918.1; NP_001230111.1 | NP_031537; NP_001390638 |
| Location (UCSC) | Chr 13: 51.93 – 52.01 Mb | Chr 8: 22.48 – 22.55 Mb |
| PubMed search |
- Wikidata
| View/Edit Human | View/Edit Mouse |

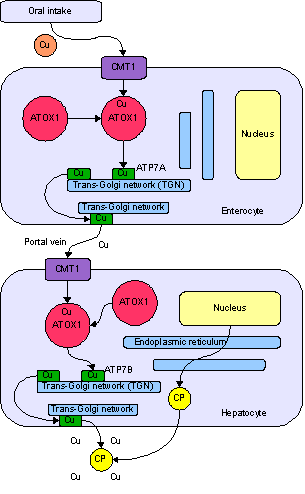
Physiological pathway of copper in human body. Cu = copper, CP = ceruloplasmin, ATP7B protein is in Hepatocyte.

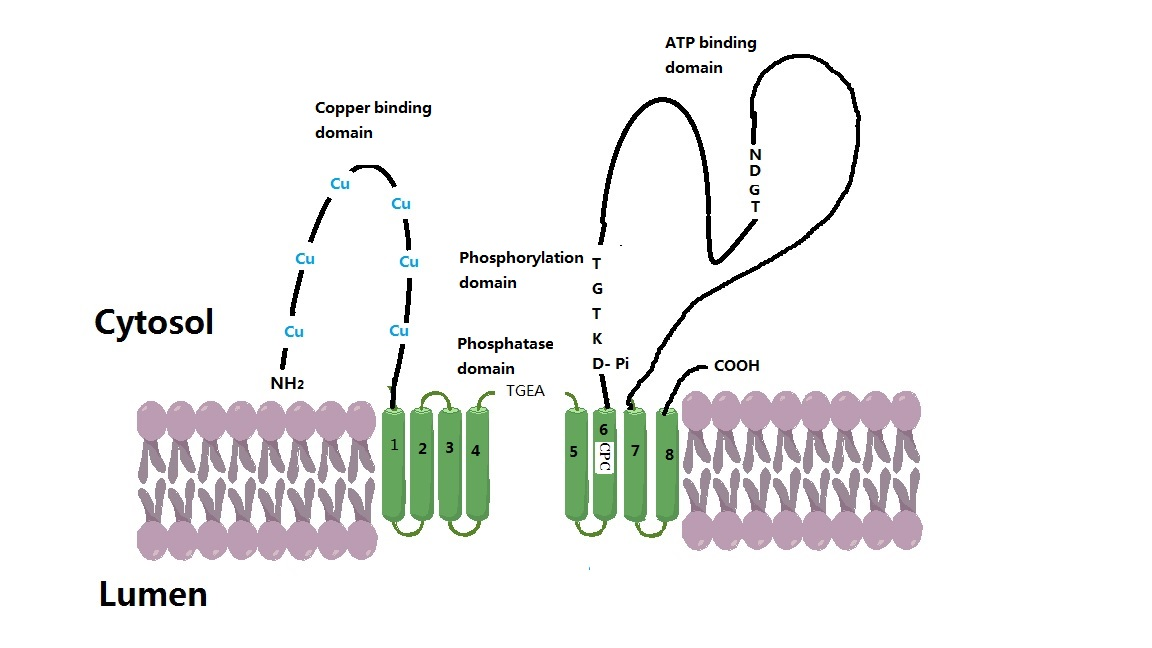
Simple model of structural feature of ATP7B protein. Cu=Copper binding motif

Wilson disease protein (WND), also known as ATP7B protein, is a copper-transporting P-type ATPase which is encoded by the ATP7B gene. The ATP7B protein is located in the trans-Golgi network of the liver and brain and balances the copper level in the body by excreting excess copper into bile and plasma. Genetic disorder of the ATP7B gene may cause Wilson's disease, a disease in which copper accumulates in tissues, leading to neurological or psychiatric issues and liver diseases.

== Gene ==
Wilson disease protein is associated with ATP7B gene, approximately 80 Kb, located on human chromosome 13 and consists of 21 exons. The mRNA transcribed by ATP7B gene has a size of 7.5 Kb, and which encodes a protein of 1465 amino acids.

The gene is a member of the P-type cation transport ATPase family and encodes a protein with several membrane-spanning domains, an ATPase consensus sequence, a hinge domain, a phosphorylation site, and at least two putative copper-binding sites. This protein functions as a monomer, exporting copper out of the cells, such as the efflux of hepatic copper into the bile. Alternate transcriptional splice variants, encoding different isoforms with distinct cellular localizations, have been characterized. Wilson's disease is caused by various mutations. One of the common mutations is single base pair mutation, H1069Q.

== Structure ==
ATP7B protein is a copper-transporting P-type ATPase, synthesized as a membrane protein of 165 KDa in human hepatoma cell line, and which is 57% homologous to Menkes disease-associated protein ATP7A.

ATP7B consists of several domains:

- Phosphatase domain (TGEA motif Thr-Gly-Glu-Ala)
- Phosphorylation domain (DKTGT motif Asp-Lys-Thr-Gly-Thr)
- ATP binding domain (TGDN motif)
- Metal binding domain (six copper binding motifs at the N-terminus in the cytosol)
- Eight transmembrane segments

The CPC motif (Cys-Pro-Cys) in transmembrane segment 6 characterizes the protein as a heavy metal transporting ATPase.

The copper binding motif also shows a high affinity to other transition metal ions such as zinc Zn(II), cadmium Cd(II), gold Au(III), and mercury Hg(II). However, copper is able to decrease the zinc binding affinity at low concentration and increase copper binding affinity dramatically with increasing concentration to ensure a strong binding between the motif and copper.

As a P-type ATPases, ATP7B undergoes auto-phosphorylation of a key conserved aspartic acid (D) residue in the DKTGT motif. The ATP binding to the protein initiates the reaction and copper binds to the transmembrane region. Then phosphorylation occurs at the aspartic acid residue in the DKTGT motif with Cu release. Then dephosphorylation of the aspartic acid residue recovers the protein to ready for the next transport.

== Function ==
Most of ATP7B protein is located in the trans-Golgi network (TGN) of hepatocytes, which is different from its homologous protein ATP7A. Small amount of ATP7B is located in the brain.

As a copper-transporting protein, one major function is delivering copper to copper dependent enzymes in Golgi apparatus (e.g. ceruloplasmin (CPN)).

In the human body, the liver plays an important role in copper regulation including removal of extra copper. ATP7B participates in the physiological pathway in the copper removal process in two ways: secreting copper into plasma and excreting copper into bile.

== Interactions ==
=== ATOX1 ===
ATP7B receives copper from cytosolic protein antioxidant 1 copper chaperone (ATOX1). This protein targets ATP7B directly in liver in order to transport copper. ATOX1 transfers copper from cytosol to the metal binding domain of ATP7B which control the catalytic activity of ATP7B.

Several mutations in ATOX1 can block the copper pathways and cause Wilson disease.

=== GLRX ===
ATP7B interacts with glutaredoxin-1 (GLRX). Subsequent transport is promoted through the reduction of intramolecular disulfide bonds by GLRX catalysis.

== Associations with Wilson's disease ==
Wilson disease happens when accumulation of copper inside the liver causes mitochondrial damage and cell destruction and shows symptoms of hepatic disease. Then, the loss of excretion of copper in bile leads to an increasing concentration of copper level in urine and causes kidney problems. Therefore, symptoms of Wilson's disease could be various including kidney disease and neurological disease. The major cause is the malfunction of ATP7B by single base pair mutations, deletions, frame-shifts, splice errors in ATP7B gene.

== See also ==
- ATP7A and Menkes disease
- ATOX1
