= Copper histidinate =

Medication

Clinical data
- Trade names: Zycubo
- Other names: CUTX-101, Copper(II) bis(histidinate)
- AHFS/Drugs.com: Monograph
- MedlinePlus: a626027
- License data: US DailyMed: Copper histidinate
- Routes of administration: Subcutaneous
- ATC code: None

Legal status
- Legal status: US: ℞-only

Identifiers
- IUPAC name: Copper bis((2S)-2-amino-3-(1H-imidazol-5-yl)propanoate)
- CAS Number: 13870-80-9
- PubChem CID: 151722
- DrugBank: DB32041
- ChemSpider: 133722
- UNII: 9078K3MO9U
- KEGG: D13117
- CompTox Dashboard (EPA): DTXSID30154803

Chemical and physical data
- Formula: C_{12}H_{16}CuN_{6}O_{4}
- Molar mass: 371.844 g·mol^{−1}
- 3D model (JSmol): Interactive image
- SMILES: C1=C(NC=N1)C[C@@H](C(=O)[O-])N.C1=C(NC=N1)C[C@@H](C(=O)[O-])N.[Cu+2]
- InChI: InChI=1S/2C6H9N3O2.Cu/c2*7-5(6(10)11)1-4-2-8-3-9-4;/h2*2-3,5H,1,7H2,(H,8,9)(H,10,11);/q;;+2/p-2/t2*5-;/m00./s1; Key:UUYDYUZBCIHUFZ-MDTVQASCSA-L

Copper histidinate, sold under the brand name Zycubo, is a medication used for the treatment of Menkes disease. Copper histidinate is a copper replacement therapy given by subcutaneous injection.

The most common side effects include infections, respiratory problems, seizures, vomiting, fever, anemia and injection site reactions.

Copper histidinate was approved for medical use in the United States in January 2026.

== Medical uses ==
Copper histidinate is indicated for the treatment of Menkes disease in children.

Menkes disease is a neurodegenerative disorder caused by a genetic defect that impairs a child's ability to absorb copper. The disease is characterized by seizures, failure to gain weight and grow, developmental delays, and intellectual disability. It leads to abnormalities of the vascular system, bladder, bowel, bones, muscles, and nervous system.

== Side effects ==
The most common side effects include infections, respiratory problems, seizures, vomiting, fever, anemia and injection site reactions.

== History ==
The US Food and Drug Administration (FDA) approved copper histidinate based on evidence from two clinical trials, in which efficacy and safety were evaluated in 66 and 129 participants with Menkes disease, respectively, treated with copper histidinate. The trials were conducted at a single site in the United States. Copper histidinate was evaluated in 129 participants with Menkes disease receiving three years of copper histidinate treatment in two open-label, single-arm clinical trials (trial 1, NCT00001262 and trial 2, NCT00811785). Survival data from participants treated with copper histidinate in these two trials were compared to survival data from an untreated contemporaneous external control cohort as collected under a protocol amendment of trial 2. In both trials, participants aged younger than one year of age received 1.45 mg of copper histidinate given subcutaneously twice a day until they reached one year of age; participants aged one year of age and older received 1.45 mg of copper histidinate subcutaneously once daily for up to three years. Safety data were evaluated in 129 participants receiving copper histidinate in trial 1 and trial 2. There were insufficient safety data in the control group for evaluation.

== Society and culture ==
=== Legal status ===
Copper histidinate was approved for medical use in the United States in January 2026. The US Food and Drug Administration (FDA) granted the application for copper histidinate priority review, fast track, breakthrough therapy, and orphan drug designations. The FDA granted approval of Zycubo to Sentynl Therapeutics.

=== Names ===
Copper histidinate is the international nonproprietary name and the United States Adopted Name.

Copper histidinate is sold under the brand name Zycubo.
