= Cytoprotection =

Cytoprotection refers to the process by which certain pharmacological agents protect cells, particularly the gastric and intestinal mucosal cells, from injury caused by harmful substances, without inhibiting or neutralizing gastric acid.

== Gastric ==
A gastric cytoprotectant is any medication that combats ulcers not by reducing gastric acid but by increased mucus and bicarbonate secretion, enhancement of mucosal blood flow, cellular repair, and antioxidant activity. Examples of gastric cytoprotective agents include prostaglandins which protect the stomach mucosa against injury by increasing gastric mucus secretion. Nonsteroidal anti-inflammatory drugs (NSAIDs) inhibit the synthesis of prostaglandins and thereby make the stomach more susceptible to injury. Gastric cytoprotective drugs include carbenoxolone, deglycyrrhizinised liquorice, sucralfate (aluminium hydroxide and sulphated sucrose), misoprostol (a prostaglandin analogue), bismuth citrate and zinc L-carnosine.
