= GLRX =

Protein-coding gene in the species Homo sapiens

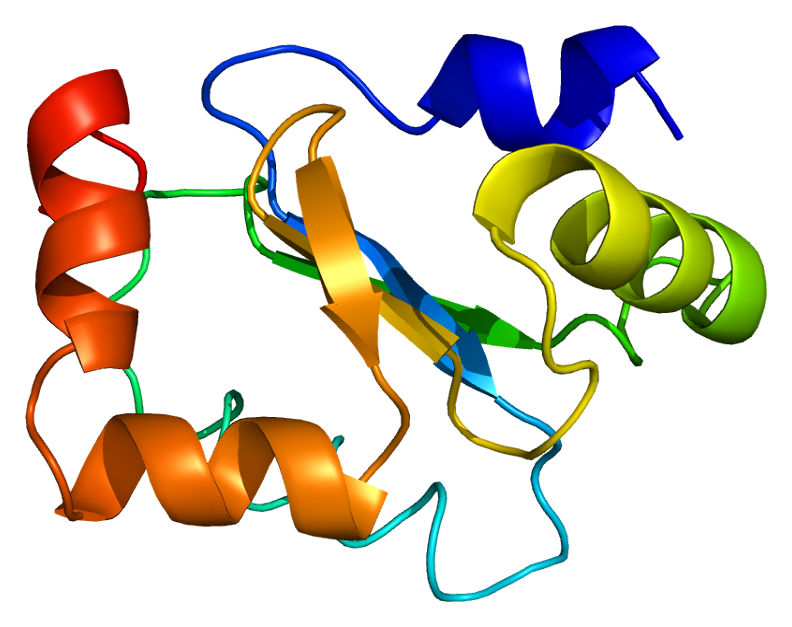

Identifiers
- Aliases: GLRX, GRX, GRX1, glutaredoxin
- External IDs: OMIM: 600443; MGI: 2135625; GeneCards: GLRX
Available structures
PDB	Ortholog search: PDBe RCSB
PDB	List of PDB id codes 1B4Q, 1JHB, 4RQR

Gene location (Human)
Chr.	Chromosome 5 (human)
Band	5q15	Start	95,751,319 bp
Band	5q15	End	95,822,726 bp

Gene location (Mouse)
Chr.	Chromosome 13 (mouse)
Band	13 C1|13 40.95 cM	Start	75,987,987 bp
Band	13 C1|13 40.95 cM	End	75,998,273 bp
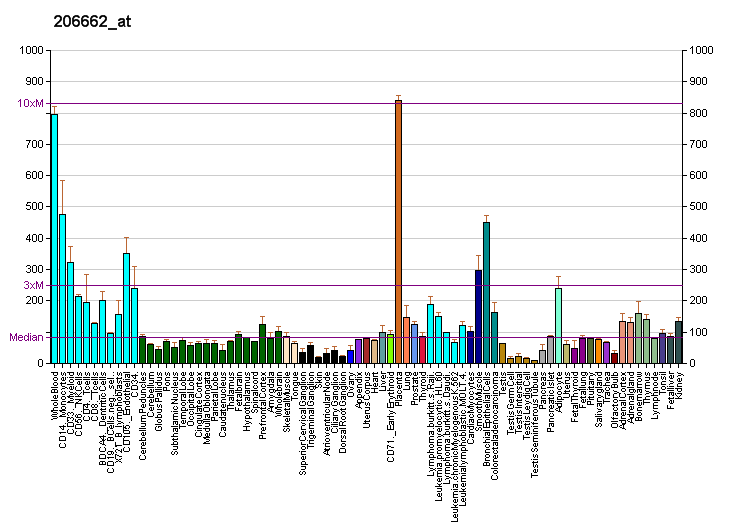

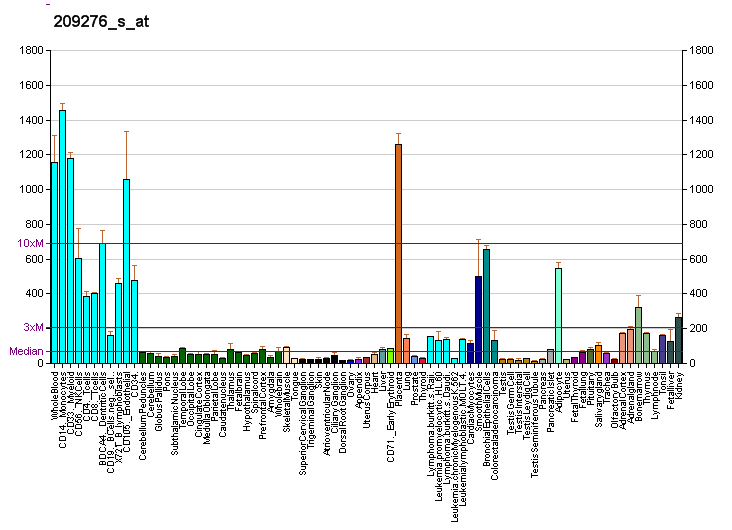
RNA expression pattern
Bgee	Human / Mouse (ortholog); Top expressed in: jejunal mucosa; decidua; stromal cell of endometrium; monocyte; skin of thigh; mucosa of ileum; duodenum; oocyte; gastrocnemius muscle; human kidney / Top expressed in: granulocyte; esophagus; primary oocyte; jejunum; ileum; lip; duodenum; zygote; blastocyst; epithelium of stomach; More reference expression data
BioGPS	More reference expression data
Gene ontology
Molecular function	protein-disulfide reductase activity; electron transfer activity; glutathione oxidoreductase activity; protein N-terminus binding; glutathione disulfide oxidoreductase activity
Cellular component	cytoplasm; cytosol; extracellular exosome; mitochondrion; nucleus
Biological process	positive regulation of sodium ion transmembrane transporter activity; nucleobase-containing small molecule interconversion; positive regulation of membrane potential; protein deglutathionylation; cell redox homeostasis; electron transport chain
Sources:Amigo / QuickGO
Orthologs
Databases	NCBI: entry; OMA: entry
Species	Human	Mouse
Entrez	2745	93692
Ensembl	ENSG00000173221	ENSMUSG00000021591
UniProt	P35754	Q9QUH0
RefSeq (mRNA)	NM_002064; NM_001118890; NM_001243658; NM_001243659	NM_053108; NM_001360151
RefSeq (protein)	NP_001112362; NP_001230587; NP_001230588; NP_002055	NP_444338; NP_001347080
Location (UCSC)	Chr 5: 95.75 – 95.82 Mb	Chr 13: 75.99 – 76 Mb
PubMed search
- Wikidata
View/Edit Human	View/Edit Mouse

Glutaredoxin-1 is a protein that in humans is encoded by the GLRX gene.

== Interactions ==
GLRX has been shown to interact with Wilson disease protein and ATP7A.
