= John Menkes =

Physician who identified two metabolic diseases

John Hans Menkes
- Born: December 20, 1928; Vienna
- Died: November 22, 2008 (aged 79); Los Angeles
- Education: University of Southern California (B.S., M.S. organic chemistry); Johns Hopkins (M.D.)
- Known for: Identifying maple syrup urine disease, Menkes disease
- Medical career
- Profession: Physician
- Institutions: Boston Children's Hospital (intern); Johns Hopkins; UCLA
- Sub-specialties: Pediatric neurology
- Research: Genetic disorders
- Awards: Drama-Logue Award, Hower Award (Child Neurology Society)

John Hans Menkes (December 20, 1928 – November 22, 2008) was an Austrian-American pediatric neurologist and author of fictional novels and plays. He identified two inherited diseases: maple syrup urine disease which is a defect in amino acid metabolism, and a defect in copper transport which bears his name. In addition to a career in academic medicine, he pursued a career in writing, publishing novels and plays.

== Early life ==
Menkes was born in 1928 in Vienna, Austria. His family fled Austria for Ireland days before the start of World War II, and later moved to California. He was interested in journalism, but his father, a fourth-generation physician, convinced him to go into medicine. He earned a bachelor's degree and a master's degree in organic chemistry from the University of Southern California.

== Medical training ==
After receiving his M.D. from Johns Hopkins in 1952, he was an intern at Boston Children's Hospital. There, he encountered an unusual case. A child was showing signs of decline. The mother had two previous sons and a daughter, who had undergone the same changes and she had noted that their urine had a smell reminiscent of maple syrup, unlike their two healthy sisters. The child died after one week of life. Samples of urine were examined, but no specific compound had been identified before the samples were exhausted. Among techniques, the odor was compared, by smell, to an inventory of organic chemicals. Menkes, Peter Hurst (a resident), and John Craig (pathologist) published the account in a paper that was later listed in the Science Citation Index "Citation Classics".

He went to Johns Hopkins for residency in psychology. The head of child neurology, Frank Ford, was aware of his paper and suggested that he should study neurology instead. He was drafted and served as a pediatrician at the Pepperrell Air Force Base in Newfoundland for the Northeast Air Command during the Korean War. Following his military service, he trained in pediatric neurology at Bellevue Hospital in New York City

In 1957, as a pediatric neurology fellow (with a research budget of $35), he encountered another case of what would be identified as maple syrup urine disease and was able to detect branched chain keto acids in the urine samples. During his fellowship, he also encountered a boy who was born healthy, but developed progressive muscle weakness (hypotonia) and seizures. The child had the characteristic finding of brittle hair. He published the accounts of five cases, and the metabolic defect was later identified as an X-linked recessive error in copper transport.

== Medical practice and writing ==
Menkes returned to Johns Hopkins in 1960, and became chief of pediatric neurology in 1964. In 1966, he went to UCLA where he established their division of child neurology. In 1974, the first edition of Textbook of Child Neurology was published and Menkes served as editor for six additional editions. That year went into private practice. He also dedicated time to writing, describing Anton Chekhov as his "idol and guiding light" for his ability to maintain his medical and writing careers.

In his 1986 play, The Last Inquisitor about the last Gestapo head, Ernst Kaltenbrunner, he dealt with his own relationship to the Holocaust. The Los Angeles Times found it interesting, especially in the way he took down the fourth wall and had a character play who becomes an actor who is consumed by the role of Adolf Eichmann, but found that it was more of a cerebral than emotional experience. He revisited the theme, asking how things might have been had he been born Christian instead of Jewish in Vienna, in his 2003 novel, After the Tempest.

He became a plaintiffs' expert witness in injury cases related to the pertussis vaccine and was appointed to the National Institute of Medicine's Forum for Vaccine Safety. He wrote about his experiences in the product liability debate in the form of a fictional novel, The Angry Puppet Syndrome (1999).

His 2001 comedy, Lady Macbeth Gets a Divorce, received similarly mixed reviews from Variety which called it "more schematic than compelling".

== Death ==
Menkes died from complications of cancer on November 22, 2008, at Cedars-Sinai Medical Center.

== Awards and honors ==
- Hower Award, Child Neurology Society, 1980
- Drama-Logue Award, "The Last Inquisitor", 1986
