= Occipital horn syndrome =

- Other names: Ehlers-Danlos syndrome type IX; X-Linked Cutis Laxa
- This condition is inherited in an X-linked recessive manner.
- Specialty: Endocrinology
- Complications: Aortic aneurysms
- Medication: Droxidopa, copper-histidine injections

Occipital horn syndrome (OHS), formerly considered a variant of Ehlers–Danlos syndrome, is an X-linked recessive mitochondrial and connective tissue disorder. It is caused by a deficiency in the transport of the essential mineral copper, associated with mutations in the ATP7A gene.

Only about 2/3 of children with OHS are thought to have genetically inherited the disorder; the other 1/3 do not have the disease in their family history. Since the disorder is X-linked recessive the disease affects more males. This is because they do not have a second X chromosome, unlike females, so essentially are lacking the 'backup' copy with proper function. Females are much more likely to be carriers only. For a female to be affected they must carry two defective X chromosomes, not just one.

The disorder is considered a milder variant of Menkes disease.

== Signs and symptoms ==
It is characterized by a deficiency in biliary copper excretion that causes deformations in the skeleton. These include projections on the back of the skull (parasagittal bone exostoses arising from the occipital bone—the so-called "occipital horns") as well as deformities of the elbow, radial head dislocation, hammer-shaped lateral ends of the clavicles, and abnormalities of the hips and pelvis. OHS presents in early to middle childhood. Children may present with features such as:

- Normal/slightly delayed intelligence
- Long neck, high arched palate, long face, high forehead
- Looseness of skin and "double jointed"
- Inguinal hernias
- Twisting of blood vessels
- Bladder diverticula
- Dysautonomia—inability to regulate parts of the nervous system
- Chronic diarrhea
- Coarse hair
- Low ceruloplasmin levels (9–29mg/dL)
- Damage to the central nervous system
- Muscle wasting

== Causes ==
OHS is a milder allelic variant of Menkes disease, having a later age of onset and being associated with far less severe central neurodegeneration. The milder nature of OHS is often attributable to 'leaky' splice junction mutations that allow 20–30% of ATP7A messenger RNA (mRNA) transcripts to be correctly processed. As in cases of Menkes disease, individuals with OHS manifest connective tissue abnormalities resulting from deficient activity of lysyl oxidase, a copper-requiring enzyme that normally deaminates lysine and hydroxylysine in the first step of collagen crosslink formation. Such individuals also often endure inconvenient dysautonomic signs and symptoms related to a partial deficiency in dopamine-β-hydroxylase (DBH) activity. DBH, another copper-dependent enzyme, normally converts dopamine to norepinephrine, a crucial neurotransmitter in norepinephrinergic neurons. A natural mouse model of OHS, the so-called mottled blotchy model, recapitulates the connective tissue abnormalities, DBH deficiency and mild CNS damage seen in humans.

== Diagnosis ==
The initial diagnosis of Menkes disease (MD) and its milder variants such as Occipital Horn Syndrome is based on the clinical symptoms. Low serum copper and ceruloplasmin levels support the clinical suspicion of OHS, but biochemical confirmation in tissue culture is needed. The ultimate diagnostic proof is the demonstration of a molecular defect in ATP7A. Demonstration of the bony protuberances on the occiput will clinch the diagnosis, and these can be palpated in some patients.

== Treatment ==
Courses of treatment for children with OHS is dependent upon the severity of their case. Children with OHS often receive physical and occupational therapy. They may require a feeding tube to supplement nourishment if they are not growing enough. In an attempt to improve the neurological condition (seizures) copper histidine or copper chloride injections can be given early in the child's life. However, copper histidine injections have been shown ineffective for treating the connective tissue manifestations of OHS.

== Prognosis ==
The long term natural history of OHS is not known. Some patients have died suddenly as young as 17 years of age, whereas one patient has survived to age 57. Causes of death include respiratory failure, aortic aneurysm, and intracranial hemorrhage.

== Research ==
The NIH and Cyprium Therapeutics are coordinating the joint-development of an Adeno-Associated virus gene therapy named AAV-ATP7A, for Menkes disease and its milder variants such as Occipital Horn Syndrome. In March 2017, Cyprium Therapeutics acquired the World-Wide development and commercial rights to the Menkes program at NIH/NICHD through CRADA and licensing agreements with NICHD. AAV-ATP7A is still in pre-clinical stage, although it has received orphan drug designation from the FDA.

== See also ==
- Cutis laxa
- List of cutaneous conditions
- Inborn errors of metal metabolism
