= ATP7A =

Protein-coding gene in humans

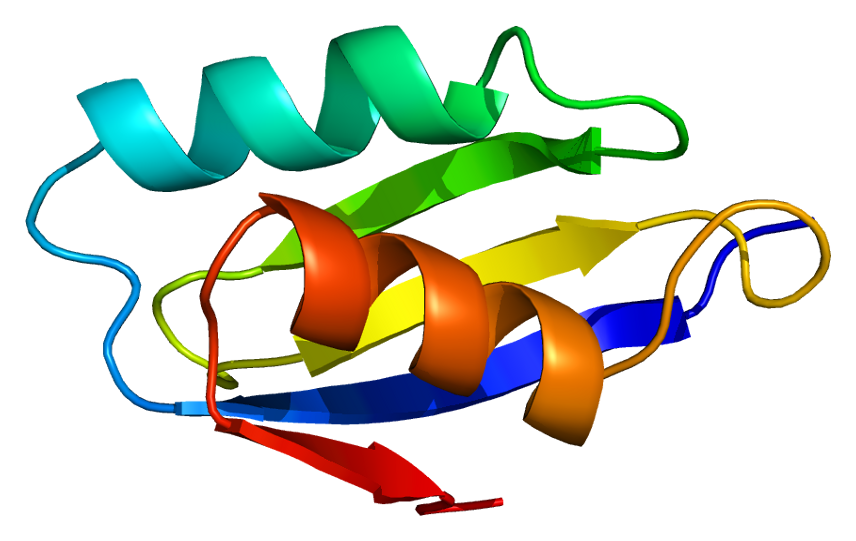

Identifiers
- Aliases: ATP7A, DSMAX, MK, MNK, SMAX3, ATPase copper transporting alpha
- External IDs: OMIM: 300011; MGI: 99400; GeneCards: ATP7A
Available structures
PDB	Ortholog search: PDBe RCSB
PDB	List of PDB id codes 1AW0, 1KVI, 1KVJ, 1Q8L, 1S6O, 1S6U, 1Y3J, 1Y3K, 1YJR, 1YJT, 1YJU, 1YJV, 2G9O, 2GA7, 2K1R, 2KIJ, 2KMV, 2KMX, 3CJK
Enzyme activity
EC #	BRENDA	ExPASy	KEGG	MetaCyc
7.2.2.8	↗	↗	↗	↗

Gene location (Human)
Chr.	X chromosome (human)
Band	Xq21.1	Start	77,910,690 bp
Band	Xq21.1	End	78,050,395 bp

Gene location (Mouse)
Chr.	X chromosome (mouse)
Band	X D|X 47.36 cM	Start	105,070,882 bp
Band	X D|X 47.36 cM	End	105,168,532 bp
RNA expression pattern
Bgee	Human / Mouse (ortholog); Top expressed in: buccal mucosa cell; trabecular bone; skin of thigh; germinal epithelium; corpus epididymis; tibia; Achilles tendon; parietal pleura; visceral pleura; skin of hip / Top expressed in: Epithelium of choroid plexus; Rostral migratory stream; internal carotid artery; choroid plexus of fourth ventricle; external carotid artery; retinal pigment epithelium; vas deferens; left lung lobe; efferent ductule; iris; More reference expression data
BioGPS	n/a
Gene ontology
Molecular function	nucleotide binding; copper ion binding; metal ion binding; hydrolase activity; ATPase-coupled cation transmembrane transporter activity; copper ion transmembrane transporter activity; ATP binding; superoxide dismutase copper chaperone activity; copper-dependent protein binding; protein binding; chaperone binding; P-type divalent copper transporter activity; cuprous ion binding
Cellular component	trans-Golgi network transport vesicle; cytoplasm; integral component of membrane; trans-Golgi network; Golgi apparatus; cytosol; neuron projection; membrane; soma; endoplasmic reticulum; perinuclear region of cytoplasm; brush border membrane; basolateral plasma membrane; secretory granule; plasma membrane; nucleus; late endosome; microvillus; apical plasma membrane; phagocytic vesicle membrane; cell leading edge; perikaryon; membrane raft
Biological process	norepinephrine metabolic process; response to iron(III) ion; removal of superoxide radicals; detoxification of copper ion; copper ion import; neuron projection morphogenesis; pyramidal neuron development; extracellular matrix organization; collagen fibril organization; dopamine metabolic process; T-helper cell differentiation; skin development; tryptophan metabolic process; response to zinc ion; regulation of oxidative phosphorylation; locomotory behavior; cartilage development; response to copper ion; positive regulation of oxidoreductase activity; pigmentation; serotonin metabolic process; ion transport; blood vessel development; mitochondrion organization; cerebellar Purkinje cell differentiation; elastic fiber assembly; central nervous system neuron development; cation transport; in utero embryonic development; ion transmembrane transport; lung alveolus development; blood vessel remodeling; peptidyl-lysine modification; catecholamine metabolic process; metal ion transport; hair follicle morphogenesis; plasma membrane copper ion transport; lactation; positive regulation of catalytic activity; epinephrine metabolic process; elastin biosynthetic process; cellular copper ion homeostasis; copper ion transport; negative regulation of catalytic activity; liver development; response to manganese ion; response to lead ion; regulation of gene expression; positive regulation of lamellipodium assembly; antimicrobial humoral response; negative regulation of iron ion transmembrane transport; cellular response to platelet-derived growth factor stimulus; positive regulation of cell size; positive regulation of epithelial cell proliferation; cellular response to amino acid stimulus; cellular response to antibiotic; cellular response to cadmium ion; cellular response to cobalt ion; cellular response to copper ion; cellular response to iron ion; cellular response to lead ion; cellular response to hypoxia; positive regulation of response to wounding; positive regulation of vascular associated smooth muscle cell migration; regulation of cytochrome-c oxidase activity; copper ion export; transport
Sources:Amigo / QuickGO
Orthologs
Databases	NCBI: entry; OMA: entry
Species	Human	Mouse
Entrez	538	11977
Ensembl	ENSG00000165240	ENSMUSG00000033792
UniProt	Q04656	Q64430
RefSeq (mRNA)	NM_000052; NM_001282224	NM_001109757; NM_009726
RefSeq (protein)	NP_000043; NP_001269153	NP_001103227; NP_033856
Location (UCSC)	Chr X: 77.91 – 78.05 Mb	Chr X: 105.07 – 105.17 Mb
PubMed search
- Wikidata
View/Edit Human	View/Edit Mouse

ATP7A, also known as Menkes' protein (MNK), is a copper-transporting P-type ATPase which uses the energy arising from ATP hydrolysis to transport Cu(I) across cell membranes. The ATP7A protein is a transmembrane protein and is expressed in the intestine and all tissues except liver. In the intestine, ATP7A regulates Cu(I) absorption in the human body by transporting Cu(I) from the small intestine into the blood. In other tissues, ATP7A shuttles between the Golgi apparatus and the cell membrane to maintain proper Cu(I) concentrations (since there is no free Cu(I) in the cell, Cu(I) ions are all tightly bound) in the cell and provides certain enzymes with Cu(I) (e.g. peptidyl-α-monooxygenase, tyrosinase, and lysyl oxidase). The X-linked, inherited, lethal genetic disorder of the ATP7A gene causes Menkes disease, a copper deficiency resulting in early childhood death.

== Gene ==
The ATP7A gene is located on the long (q) arm of the X chromosome at band Xq21.1. The encoded ATP7A protein has 1,500 amino acids. At least 12 disease-causing mutations in this gene have been discovered. Mutations/additions/deletions of this gene often cause copper deficiency, which leads to progressive neurodegeneration and death in children.

== Structure ==
ATP7A is a transmembrane protein with the N- and C-termini both oriented towards the cytosol (see picture). It is highly homologous to protein ATP7B. ATP7A contains three major functional domains:

1. Eight transmembrane segments that form a channel and allow for Cu(I) to pass through the membrane;
2. An ATP-binding domain;
3. A large N-terminal cytosolic domain that contains six repeated Cu(I)-binding sites, each containing a GMTCXXC motif.

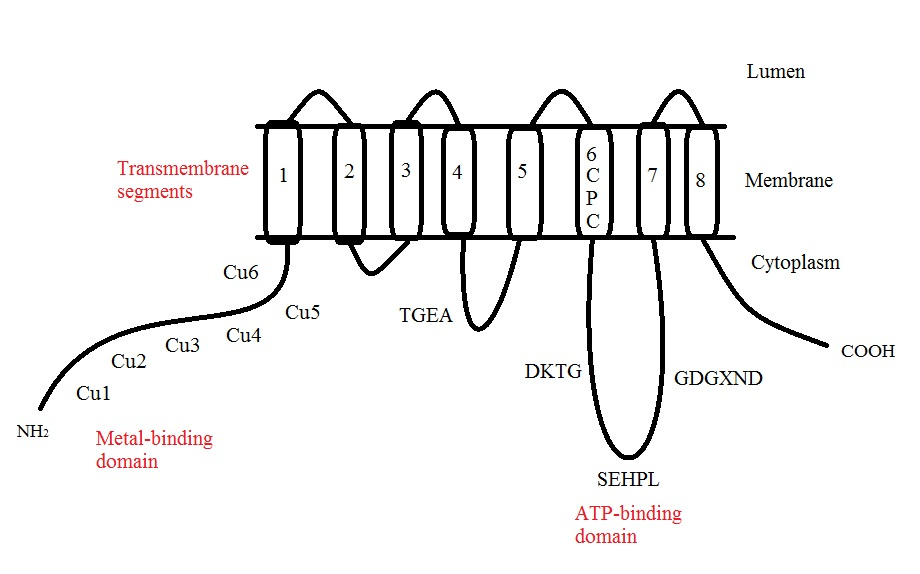
Proposed structure of copper-transporting protein ATP7A

Many motifs in the ATP7A structure are conserved:

- The TGEA motif lies in the loop on the cytosolic side between transmembrane segments 4 and 5 and is involved in energy transfer.
- The CPC motif located in transmembrane segment 6 is common for all heavy metal transporting ATPases.

Between transmembrane segments 6 and 7 is a large cytoplasmic loop, where three motifs are located: DKTG, SEHPL, and GDGXND.

- The DKTG motif is essential for the proper function of the ATPase. The aspartic acid (D) residue is phosphorylated during the transport cycles.
- The SEHPL motif only exists in heavy metal transporting P-type ATPases. Without the histidine (H) residue ATP7A may not function properly.
- The GDGXND motif near transmembrane segment 7 is thought to contain mainly α-helices and serves as a structural support.

The six Cu(I)-binding sites at the N-terminal bind one Cu(I) each. This binding site is not specific for Cu(I) and can bind various transition metal ions. Cd(II), Au(III) and Hg(II) bind to the binding site more tightly than does Zn(II), whereas Mn(II) and Ni(II) have lower affinities relative to Zn(II). In the case of Cu(I), a possible cooperative-binding mechanism is observed. When the Cu(I) concentration is low, Cu(I) has a lower affinity for ATP7A compared to Zn(II); as the Cu(I) concentration increases, a dramatic increasing affinity of Cu(I) for the protein is observed.

== Conformational change ==
The two cysteine (C) residues in each Cu(I)-binding site are coordinated to Cu(I) with a S-Cu(I)-S angle between 120 and 180° and a Cu-S distance of 2.16 Å. Experimental results from a homologous protein ATP7B suggests that reducing reagents are involved, and upon Cu(I) binding the disulfide bonding between the cysteine residues is broken as cysteine starts to bind to Cu(I), leading to a series of conformational changes at the N-terminal of the protein, and possibly activating the Cu(I)-transporting activity of other cytosolic loops.

Of the six copper(I)-binding sites, two are considered enough for the function of Cu(I) transport. The reason why there are six binding sites remains not fully understood. However, some scientists have proposed that the other four sites may serve as a Cu(I) concentration detector.

== Transport mechanism ==
ATP7A belongs to a transporter family called P-type ATPases, which catalyze auto-phosphorylation of a key conserved aspartic acid (D) residue within the enzyme. The first step is ATP binding to the ATP-binding domain and Cu(I) binding to the transmembrane region. Then ATP7A is phosphorylated at the key aspartic acid (D) residue in the highly conserved DKTG motif, accompanied by Cu(I) release. A subsequent dephosphorylation of the intermediate finishes the catalytic cycle. Within each cycle, ATP7A interconverts between at least two different conformations, E1 and E2. In the E1 state, Cu(I) is tightly bound to the binding sites on the cytoplasmic side; in the E2 state, the affinity of ATP7A for Cu(I) decreases and Cu(I) is released on the extracellular side.

== Function ==
ATP7A is important for regulating copper Cu(I) in mammals. This protein is found in most tissues, but it is not expressed in the liver. In the small intestine, the ATP7A protein helps control the absorption of Cu(I) from food. After Cu(I) ions are absorbed into enterocytes, ATP7A is required to transfer them across the basolateral membrane into the circulation.

In other organs and tissues, the ATP7A protein has a dual role and shuttles between two locations within the cell. The protein normally resides in a cell structure called the Golgi apparatus, which modifies and transports newly produced enzymes and other proteins. Here, ATP7A supplies Cu(I) to certain enzymes (e.g. peptidyl-α-monooxygenase, tyrosinase, and lysyl oxidase) that are critical for the structures and functions of brain, bone, skin, hair, connective tissue, and the nervous system. If Cu(I) levels in the cell environment are elevated, however, ATP7A moves to the cell membrane and eliminates excess Cu(I) from the cell.

The functions of ATP7A in some tissues of the human body are as follows:

Tissue	Location	Function
Kidney	Expressed in epithelial cells of the proximal and distal renal tubules	Removes excess Cu(I) to maintain Cu(I) level in the kidney
Parenchyma	In the cytotrophoblast, syncytiotrophoblast and foetal vascular endothelial cells	Delivers Cu(I) to placental cuproenzymes and transports Cu(I) into the foetal circulation
Central nervous system	Various locations	Distributes Cu(I) in the various compartments of the central nervous system

== Interactions ==
ATP7A has been shown to interact with ATOX1 and GLRX. Antioxidant 1 copper chaperone (ATOX1) is required to maintain Cu(I) copper homeostasis in the cell. It can bind and transport cytosolic Cu(I) to ATP7A in the trans-Golgi-network. Glutaredoxin-1 (GRX1) has is also essential for ATP7A function. It promotes Cu(I) binding for subsequent transport by catalyzing the reduction of disulfide bridges. It may also catalyze de-glutathionylation reaction of the C (cysteine) residues within the six Cu(I)-binding motifs GMTCXXC.

== Clinical significance ==
Menkes disease is caused by mutations in the ATP7A gene. Researchers have identified different ATP7A mutations that cause Menkes disease and occipital horn syndrome (OHS), the milder form of Menkes disease. Many of these mutations delete part of the gene and are predicted to produce a shortened ATP7A protein that is unable to transport Cu(I). Other mutations insert additional DNA base pairs or use the wrong base pairs, which leads to ATP7A proteins that do not function properly.

The altered proteins that result from ATP7A mutations impair the absorption of copper from food, fail to supply copper to certain enzymes, or get stuck in the cell membrane, unable to shuttle back and forth from the Golgi. As a result of the disrupted activity of the ATP7A protein, copper is poorly distributed to cells in the body. Copper accumulates in some tissues, such as the small intestine and kidneys, while the brain and other tissues have unusually low levels. The decreased supply of copper can reduce the activity of numerous copper-containing enzymes that are necessary for the structure and function of bone, skin, hair, blood vessels, and the nervous system. Copper is also critical for the propagation of prion proteins, and mice with mutations in Atp7a have a delayed onset of prion disease. A comprehensive resource of clinically annotated genetic variants in ATP7A gene has been made available confirming to the American College of Medical Genetics and Genomics guidelines for interpretation of sequence variants.

== Inhibition ==
A proton pump inhibitor, Omeprazole, has been shown to block ATP7A, in addition to its more established role of blocking ATP4A.

== See also ==
- ATP7B and Wilson's disease
- ATOX1
