= Zinc transporter 1 =

Protein found in humans

SLC30A1

Identifiers
- Aliases: SLC30A1, ZNT1, ZRC1, solute carrier family 30 member 1
- External IDs: OMIM: 609521; MGI: 1345281; GeneCards: SLC30A1

Gene location (Human)
Chr.	Chromosome 1 (human)
Band	1q32.3	Start	211,571,568 bp
Band	1q32.3	End	211,579,161 bp

Gene location (Mouse)
Chr.	Chromosome 1 (mouse)
Band	1 H6|1 97.01 cM	Start	191,638,879 bp
Band	1 H6|1 97.01 cM	End	191,645,359 bp
RNA expression pattern
Bgee	Human / Mouse (ortholog); Top expressed in: jejunal mucosa; caput epididymis; Epithelium of choroid plexus; skin of thigh; trabecular bone; dorsal motor nucleus of vagus nerve; vulva; cartilage tissue; corpus epididymis; human penis / Top expressed in: placenta; lip; ileum; renal cortex; proximal tubule; human kidney; primary oocyte; hair; secondary oocyte; jejunum; More reference expression data
BioGPS	n/a
Gene ontology
Molecular function	calcium channel inhibitor activity; cation transmembrane transporter activity; protein binding; zinc ion transmembrane transporter activity
Cellular component	cytoplasm; integral component of membrane; Golgi apparatus; nuclear membrane; membrane; T-tubule; plasma membrane; endoplasmic reticulum; Schaffer collateral - CA1 synapse; integral component of postsynaptic density membrane
Biological process	negative regulation of neurotransmitter secretion; calcium ion import; zinc ion transport; cellular calcium ion homeostasis; response to zinc ion; cation transport; in utero embryonic development; ion transport; negative regulation of calcium ion import; detoxification of cadmium ion; negative regulation of zinc ion transmembrane import; zinc ion transmembrane transport; cellular zinc ion homeostasis; cadmium ion transmembrane transport; regulation of sequestering of zinc ion; transmembrane transport
Sources:Amigo / QuickGO
Orthologs
Databases	NCBI: entry; OMA: entry
Species	Human	Mouse
Entrez	7779	22782
Ensembl	ENSG00000170385	ENSMUSG00000037434
UniProt	Q9Y6M5	Q60738
RefSeq (mRNA)	NM_021194	NM_009579
RefSeq (protein)	NP_067017	NP_033605
Location (UCSC)	Chr 1: 211.57 – 211.58 Mb	Chr 1: 191.64 – 191.65 Mb
PubMed search
- Wikidata
View/Edit Human	View/Edit Mouse

Zinc transporter 1 is a protein which in humans is encoded by the SLC30A1 gene.

== Function ==
SLC30A1 modulates zinc permeation through the L-type calcium channel. SLC30A1 downregulates not only Zn^{++} influx, but also Ca^{++} influx, thereby protecting cells from the effects of excessive cation permeation.

== See also ==
- Solute carrier family
