= George Menke =

American football player and coach

Biographical details
- Born: Washington, D.C., U.S.
- Died: March 13, 1978; Cape Canaveral, Florida, U.S.

Playing career
- 1929: Catholic University
- Position: Guard

Coaching career (HC unless noted)
- 1939: American

George V. Menke (died March 13, 1978) was an American football player and coach. He served as the head football coach at American University in Washington, D.C. in 1939. Menke played college football at Catholic University of America.
