= S-Glutathionylation =

Post-translational modification

S-Glutathionylation is the posttranslational modification of protein cysteine residues by the addition of glutathione, the most abundant and important low-molecular-mass thiol within most cell types.

Protein S-glutathionylation is involved in the following:

- oxidative stress
- nitrosative stress
- preventing irreversible oxidation of protein thiols
- control of cell-signalling pathways by modulating protein function

Protein S-glutathionylation, which is reversible, entails formation of a mixed disulfide. It is one of a host of reactions of the cysteine residues.
