= Peptidylglycine monooxygenase =

peptidylglycine monooxygenase

Identifiers
- EC no.: 1.14.17.3
- CAS no.: 90597-47-0

Databases
- BRENDA: enzyme data
- ExPASy: NiceZyme view
- KEGG: enzyme entry
- MetaCyc: metabolic pathway
- Rhea: reactions
- PDB structures: RCSB PDB PDBe PDBsum
- Gene Ontology: AmiGO / QuickGO
Search
- PMC: articles
- PubMed: articles
- NCBI: proteins

In enzymology, a peptidylglycine monooxygenase (EC 1.14.17.3) is an enzyme that catalyzes the chemical reaction

peptidylglycine + ascorbate + O_{2} $\rightleftharpoons$ peptidyl(2-hydroxyglycine) + dehydroascorbate + H_{2}O

The 3 substrates of this enzyme are peptidylglycine, ascorbate, and O_{2}, whereas its 3 products are peptidyl(2-hydroxyglycine), dehydroascorbate, and H_{2}O.

This enzyme belongs to the family of oxidoreductases, specifically those acting on paired donors, with O2 as oxidant and incorporation or reduction of oxygen. The oxygen incorporated need not be derived from O2 with reduced ascorbate as one donor, and incorporation of one atom of oxygen into the other donor. The systematic name of this enzyme class is peptidylglycine,ascorbate:oxygen oxidoreductase (2-hydroxylating). Other names in common use include 2-hydroxylase, alpha-amidating enzyme, peptide-alpha-amide synthetase, synthase, peptide alpha-amide, peptide alpha-amidating enzyme, peptide alpha-amide synthase, alpha-hydroxylase, alpha-amidating monooxygenase, PAM-A, PAM-B, and PAM. It employs one cofactor, copper.

== Structural studies ==
As of late 2007, 8 structures have been solved for this class of enzymes, with PDB accession codes PDB: 1OPM, PDB: 1PHM, PDB: 1SDW, PDB: 1YI9, PDB: 1YIP, PDB: 1YJK, PDB: 1YJL, and PDB: 3PHM.
