= Metallochaperones =

Metallochaperones are a distinct class of molecular chaperones that facilitate the intracellular transport of metal ions, such as copper and zinc, to different metalloproteins, e.g., metalloenzymes, in cells through specific protein-protein interactions. In this way, for example, the proteins ensure that the correct metal ion cofactor is acquired by its corresponding metalloenzyme. Metallochaperones are essential to the proper functioning of cells, playing a vital role in a large number of biological processes including, for example, respiration, photosynthesis, neurotransmission, and protein folding.

Prior to the discovery of metallochaperones in the late 1990s, biologists believed that metal ions freely diffused within cells without the aid of auxiliary proteins. Today, it is well established that these special molecules contribute to the intracellular homeostatic control of biometal ions.
