= Menkes disease =

X-linked recessive copper-transport disorder

- Other names: Trichopoliodystrophy, copper transport disease, steely hair disease, kinky hair disease
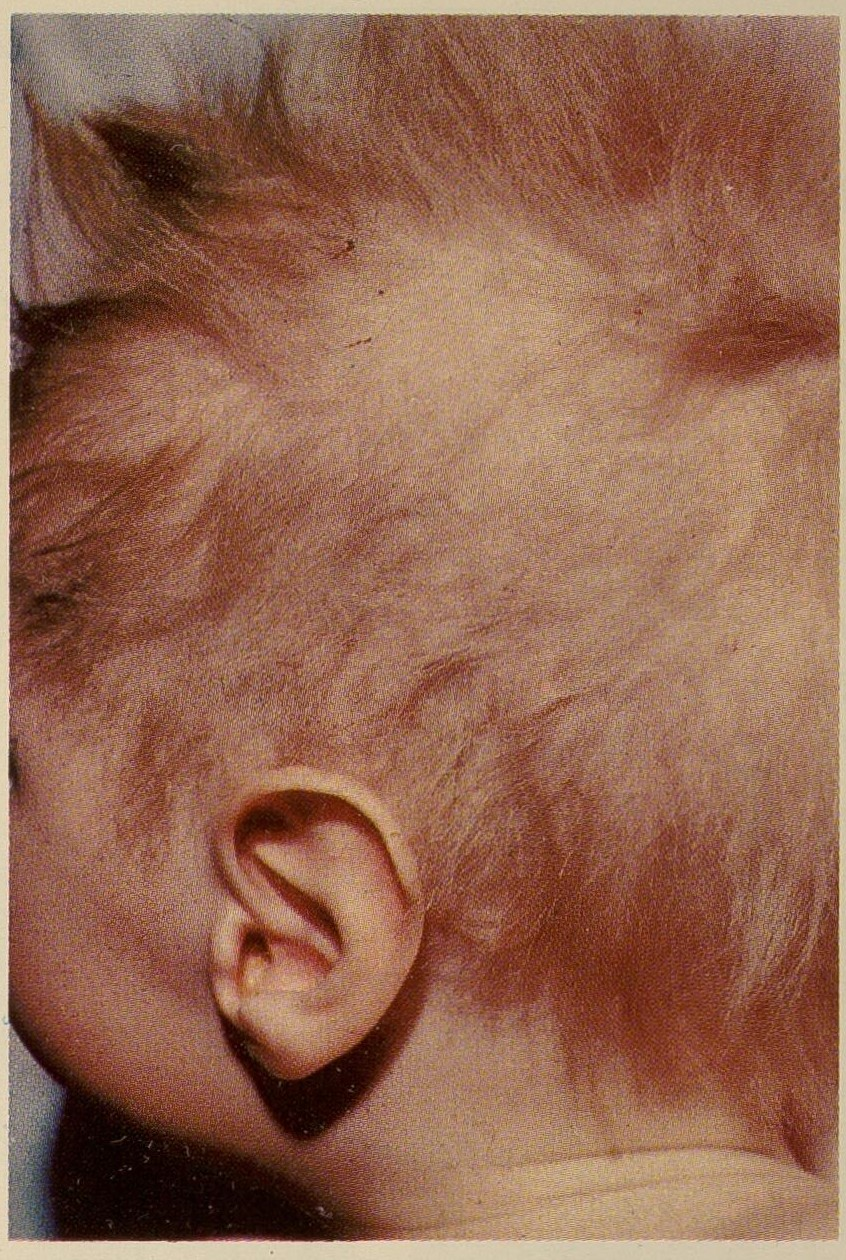
- Child with Menkes disease, showing characteristic hair
- Specialty: Pediatrics, Medical Genetics
- Causes: Mutations in genes coding for the copper-transport protein ATP7A
- Frequency: 1 in 254,000 (Europe); 1 in 357,143 (Japan)

Menkes disease (MNK), also known as Menkes syndrome, is an X-linked recessive disorder caused by mutations in genes coding for the copper-transport protein ATP7A, leading to copper deficiency. Characteristic findings include kinky hair, growth failure, and nervous system deterioration. Like all X-linked recessive conditions, Menkes disease is more common in males than in females. The disorder was first described by John Hans Menkes in 1962.

== Signs and symptoms ==
Affected infants may be born prematurely. Signs of the disease appear during infancy, typically after a two- to three-month period of normal or slightly slowed development that is followed by a loss of early developmental skills and subsequent developmental delay. Patients exhibit hypotonia (weak muscle tone), failure to thrive, hypothermia (subnormal body temperature), sagging facial features, seizures, and metaphyseal widening. Hair appears strikingly peculiar: kinky, colorless or silvery, and brittle. There can be extensive neurodegeneration in the gray matter of the brain. Arteries in the brain can also be twisted with frayed and split inner walls. This can lead to rupture or blockage of the arteries. Weakened bones (osteoporosis) may result in fractures.

Occipital horn syndrome (sometimes called X-linked cutis laxa and previously called Ehlers-Danlos type 9) is a mild form of Menkes syndrome that begins in early to middle childhood. It is characterized by calcium deposits in a bone at the base of the skull (occipital bone), coarse hair, and loose skin and joints.

== Cause ==
Mutations in the ATP7A gene, located on chromosome Xq21.1, lead to Menkes syndrome. This condition is inherited in an X-linked recessive pattern. About 30% of MNK cases are due to new mutations and 70% are inherited, almost always from the mother. Even though the disease is more common in males, females can still be a carrier of the disease. As the result of a mutation in the ATP7A gene, copper is poorly distributed to cells in the body. Copper accumulates in some tissues, such as the small intestine and kidneys, while the brain and other tissues have unusually low levels. The decreased supply of copper can reduce the activity of numerous copper-containing enzymes that are necessary for the structure and function of bone, skin, hair, blood vessels and the nervous system such as lysyl oxidase. As with other X-linked disorders, female children of a carrier mother have an even chance of carrying the disorder, but are normally well; male children have an even chance of having the disorder or of being free from it. A genetic counselor may have useful advice.

== Mechanism ==
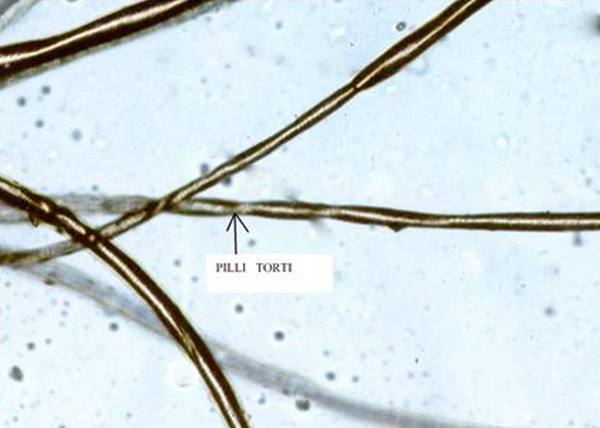
Microscopic examination of hair, revealing classical sign of pili torti.

The ATP7A gene encodes a transmembrane protein that transport copper across the cell membranes. It is found throughout the body, except for the liver. In the small intestines, the ATP7A protein helps control the absorption of copper from food. In other cells, the protein travels between the Golgi apparatus and the cell membrane to maintain copper concentrations in the cell. The protein is normally found in the Golgi apparatus, which is important for modifying proteins, including enzymes. In the Golgi apparatus, ATP7A protein provides copper to certain enzymes that are critical for the structure and function of bone, skin, hair, blood vessels, and the nervous system. One of the enzymes, lysyl oxidase, requires copper for proper function. This enzyme cross-links tropocollagen into strong collagen fibrils. The defective collagen contributes to many of the aforementioned connective tissue manifestations of this disease.

If copper levels become excessive, the protein will travel to the cell membrane and eliminate excess copper from the cell. Mutations in the ATP7A gene such as deletions and insertions lead to parts of the gene being deleted, resulting in a shortened ATP7A protein. This prevents the production of a functional ATP7A protein, leading to the impaired absorption of copper from food and copper will not be supplied to certain enzymes.

== Diagnosis ==
Menkes syndrome can be diagnosed by blood tests of the copper and ceruloplasmin levels, skin biopsy, and optical microscopic examination of the hair to view characteristic Menkes abnormalities. X-rays of the skull and skeleton are conducted to look for abnormalities in bone formation. Urine homovanillic acid/vanillylmandelic acid ratio has been proposed as a screening tool to support earlier detection. Since 70% of MNK cases are inherited, genetic testing of the mother can be performed to search for a mutation in the ATP7A gene.

== Treatment ==
There is no cure for Menkes disease. Early treatment with injections of copper supplements (acetate or glycinate) may be of some slight benefit. 11 of 12 newborns who were diagnosed with MNK were alive at age 4-6. Other treatment is symptomatic and supportive. Treatments to help relieve some of the symptoms includes pain medication, anti-seizure medication, feeding tube when necessary, and physical and occupational therapy. The earlier treatment is given, the better the prognosis.

Copper histidinate (Zycubo) was approved for medical use in the United States in January 2026.

== Epidemiology ==
Onset occurs during infancy, with incidence of about 1 in 100,000 to 250,000 newborns; affected infants often do not live past the age of three years, though there are rare cases in which less severe symptoms emerge later in childhood.

One European study reported a rate of 1 in 254,000; a Japanese study reported a rate of 1 in 357,143. No correlation with other inherited characteristics, or with ethnic origin, is known.

== See also ==
- Copper in health
- Folliculitis decalvans
- Hereditary copper metabolic diseases
- List of cutaneous conditions
- List of radiographic findings associated with cutaneous conditions
- Wilson's disease
