= Ammonium tetrathiomolybdate =

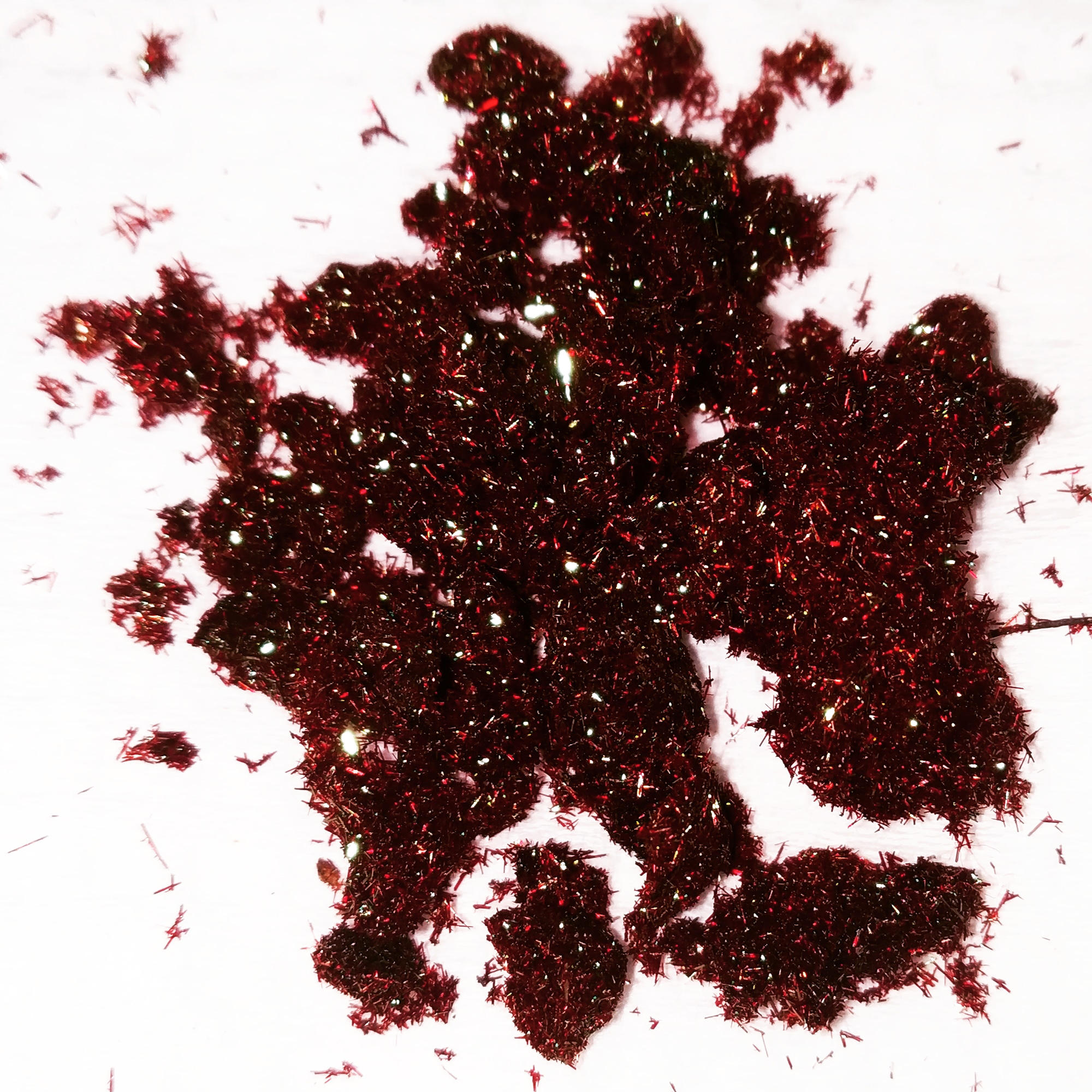

Names
- Other names ammonium thiomolybdate

Identifiers
CAS Number	15060-55-6
3D model (JSmol)	Interactive image
ChemSpider	10764593
ECHA InfoCard	100.167.865
PubChem CID	15251598
RTECS number	QA4668250
UNII	4V6I63LW1E
CompTox Dashboard (EPA)	DTXSID30895067
- InChI: InChI=1S/Mo.2H3N.4S/h;2*1H3;;;;/q;;;;;2*-1/p+2 Key: PQNOIAHNKHBLRN-UHFFFAOYSA-P; InChI=1S/Mo.2H3N.4S/h;2*1H3;;;;/q;;;;;2*-1/p+2; Key: PQNOIAHNKHBLRN-UHFFFAOYSA-P
- SMILES: [NH4+].[NH4+].[S-][Mo]([S-])(=S)=S

Properties
Chemical formula	(NH_{4})_{2}MoS_{4}
Molar mass	260.28 g/mol
Appearance	red crystals
Melting point	155 °C (311 °F; 428 K) (decomposes)

Structure
Crystal structure	Orthorhombic
Space group	Pnma (No. 62)
Lattice constant	a = 9.5867 Å, b = 6.9451 Å, c = 12.2005 Å
Lattice volume (V)	812.32 Å^{3}
Formula units (Z)	4 units per cell

Hazards
- Occupational safety and health (OHS/OSH)
Main hazards	toxic
- GHS labelling
Pictograms	(GHS07: Exclamation mark)
Signal word	Warning
Hazard statements	H315, H319, H335
Precautionary statements	P261, P264, P271, P280, P302+P352, P304+P340, P305+P351+P338, P312, P321, P332+P313, P337+P313, P362, P403+P233, P405, P501

Related compounds
Other anions	Ammonium tetrathiotungstate
Related compounds	Molybdenum disulfide
- Except where otherwise noted, data are given for materials in their standard state (at 25 °C [77 °F], 100 kPa). verify (what is ?) Infobox references

Ammonium tetrathiomolybdate is the chemical compound with the formula (NH_{4})_{2}MoS_{4}. This bright red ammonium salt is an important reagent in the chemistry of molybdenum and has been used as a building block in bioinorganic chemistry. The thiometallate (see metallate) anion has the distinctive property of undergoing oxidation at the sulfur centers concomitant with reduction of the metal from Mo(VI) to Mo(IV).

== Preparation and structure ==
The salt contains the tetrahedral [MoS_{4}]^{2−} anion. The compound is prepared by treating solutions of molybdate, [MoO_{4}]^{2−} with hydrogen sulfide in the presence of ammonia:

(NH_{4})_{2}MoO_{4} + 4 H_{2}S → (NH_{4})_{2}MoS_{4} + 4 H_{2}O

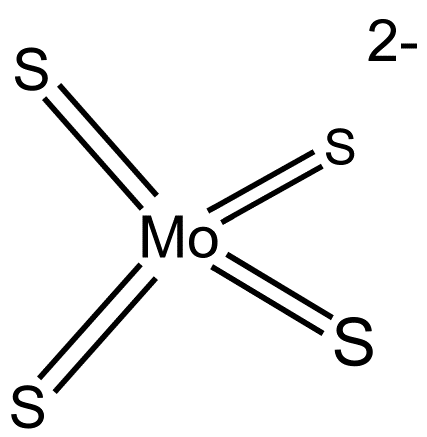
The [MoS_{4}]^{2−} anion.

== Reactions ==
The anion is also an excellent ligand. For example, with Ni(II) sources, it forms [Ni(MoS_{4})_{2}]^{2−}. Much of the chemistry of the thiomolybdate results from studies on salts of quaternised organic cations, such as [NEt_{4}]_{2}[MoS_{4}] and [PPh_{4}]_{2}[MoS_{4}] (Et = C_{2}H_{5}, Ph = C_{6}H_{5}). These organic salts are soluble in polar organic solvents such as acetonitrile and DMF.

The thermal decomposition of [NH_{4}]_{2}[MoS_{4}] leads to molybdenum trisulfide (MoS_{3}), ammonia (NH_{3}) and hydrogen sulfide (H_{2}S), beginning at 155 °C till 280 °C.

(NH_{4})_{2}MoS_{4} → MoS_{3} + 2 NH_{3} + H_{2}S

MoS_{3} then decomposes again to molybdenum disulfide (MoS_{2}) in a broad temperature range from 300 °C to 820 °C. Perfect decomposition to MoS_{2} under inert gas requires at least 800 °C according to the following reaction,

MoS_{3} → MoS_{2} + S

but it can also be achieved at 450 °C, if there is enough hydrogen.

MoS_{3} + H_{2} → MoS_{2} + H_{2}S

== Related compounds ==
Several related thio and seleno anions are known including (A = alkali metal cation, [PPh_{4}]^{+}, [NEt_{4}]^{+})

- A_{3}[VS_{4}]: ammonium tetrathiovanadate
- A_{3}[NbS_{4}]
- A_{3}[TaS_{4}]
- A_{2}[MoSe_{4}]
- A_{2}[WS_{4}]: ammonium tetrathiotungstate, piperidinium tetrathiotungstate
- A_{2}[WSe_{4}]: ammonium tetraselenotungstate, tetraethylammonium tetraselenotungstate
- A[ReS_{4}]
- (C_{5}H_{14}NO)_{2}MoS_{4} (bis-choline tetrathiomolybdate)

More complex tetrahedral anions include A_{2}[MoS_{4−x}O_{x}] and A_{2}[WS_{4−x}O_{x}]

== Uses ==
Ammonium tetrathiomolybdate was first used therapeutically in the treatment of copper toxicosis in animals. It was then introduced as a treatment in Wilson's disease, a hereditary copper metabolism disorder, in humans; it acts both by competing with copper absorption in the bowel and by increasing excretion. Clinical studies have shown ATTM can effectively lower copper levels faster than currently available treatments, and that fewer patients with an initial neurological presentation of their disease who are treated with ATTM experience neurological deterioration

Various Phase II clinical trials of ATTM for copper depletion in cancer have been performed.

ATTM has also been found to have an inhibitory effect on angiogenesis, potentially via the inhibition of Cu ion dependent membrane translocation process involving a non-classical secretion pathway. This makes it an interesting investigatory treatment for cancer, age-related macular degeneration, and other diseases featuring excessive blood vessel deposition.
