= Copper in biology =

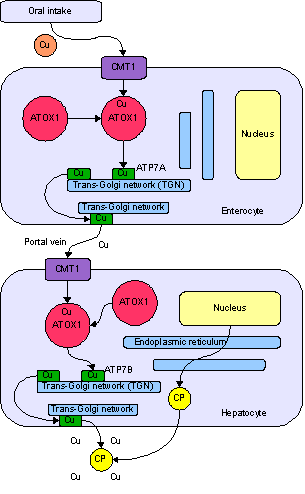
Normal absorption and distribution of copper. Cu = copper, CP = ceruloplasmin, green = ATP7B carrying copper.

Copper is an essential trace element that is vital to the health of all living things (plants, animals and microorganisms). In humans, copper is essential to the proper functioning of organs and metabolic processes. Also, in humans, copper helps maintain the nervous system, immune system, brain development, and activates genes, as well as assisting in the production of connective tissues, blood vessels, and energy. The human body has complex homeostatic mechanisms that regulate a constant supply of available copper, while eliminating excess copper, if needed to assure homeostasis. However, like all essential elements and nutrients, too much or too little nutritional ingestion of copper can result in a corresponding condition of copper excess or deficiency in the body, each of which has its own unique set of adverse health effects.

Daily dietary standards for copper have been set by various health agencies around the world. Standards adopted by some nations recommend different copper intake levels for adults, pregnant women, infants, and children, corresponding to the varying need for copper during different stages of life.

Organ meats, shellfish, nuts, seeds, chocolate, potatoes, and mushrooms are sources of dietary copper. Copper is commonly available in dietary supplements and is included in multivitamin products.

== Biochemistry ==
Copper proteins have diverse roles in biological electron transport and oxygen transportation, processes that exploit the easy interconversion of Cu(I) and Cu(II). Copper is essential in the aerobic respiration of all eukaryotes. In mitochondria, it is found in cytochrome c oxidase, which is the last protein in oxidative phosphorylation. Cytochrome c oxidase is the protein that binds the O_{2} between a copper and an iron; the protein transfers four electrons to the O_{2} molecule to reduce it to two molecules of water. Copper is also found in many superoxide dismutases, proteins that catalyze the decomposition of superoxides by converting it (by disproportionation) to oxygen or hydrogen peroxide:

- Cu^{+}-SOD + O_{2}^{−} + 2H^{+} → Cu^{2+}-SOD + H_{2}O_{2} (oxidation of copper; reduction of superoxide)
- Cu^{2+}-SOD + O_{2}^{−} → Cu^{+}-SOD + O_{2} (reduction of copper; oxidation of superoxide)

The protein hemocyanin is the oxygen carrier in most mollusks and some arthropods such as the horseshoe crab (Limulus polyphemus). Because hemocyanin is blue, these organisms have blue blood rather than the red blood of iron-based hemoglobin. Structurally related to hemocyanin are the laccases and tyrosinases. Instead of reversibly binding oxygen, these proteins hydroxylate substrates, illustrated by their role in the formation of lacquers. The biological role for copper commenced with the appearance of oxygen in Earth's atmosphere. Several copper proteins, such as the "blue copper proteins", do not interact directly with substrates; hence they are not enzymes. These proteins relay electrons by the process called electron transfer.

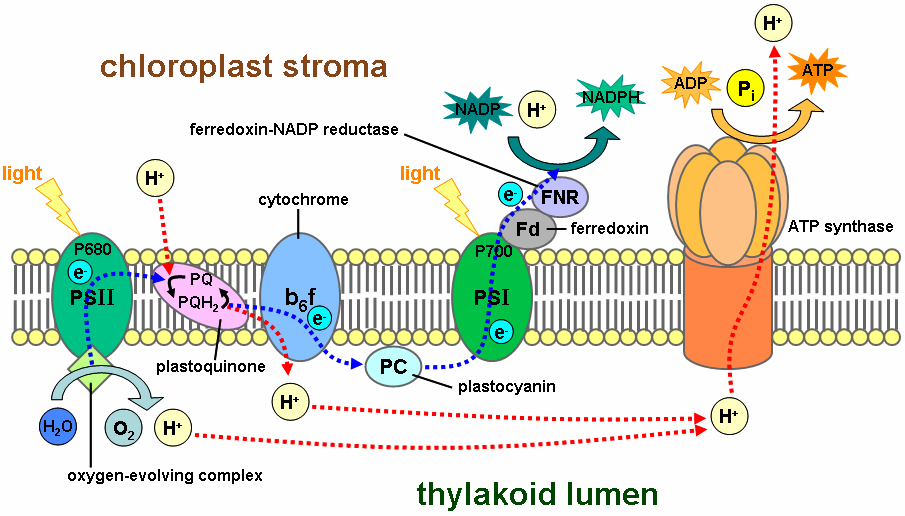
Photosynthesis functions by an elaborate electron transport chain within the thylakoid membrane. A central link in this chain is plastocyanin, a blue copper protein.

A unique tetranuclear copper center has been found in nitrous-oxide reductase.

Chemical compounds which were developed for treatment of Wilson's disease have been investigated for use in cancer therapy.

== Optimal copper levels ==
Copper deficiency and toxicity can be either of genetic or non-genetic origin. The study of copper's genetic diseases, which are the focus of intense international research activity, has shed insight into how human bodies use copper, and why it is important as an essential micronutrient. The studies have also resulted in successful treatments for genetic copper excess conditions, empowering patients whose lives were once jeopardized.

In the US, the average daily intake of copper is about 1 mg, and its bioavailability from the diet is estimated to be 65–70%, with a biological half-life of about 13–33 days. Researchers specializing in the fields of microbiology, toxicology, nutrition, and health risk assessments are working together to define the precise copper levels that are required for essentiality, while avoiding deficient or excess copper intakes. Results from these studies are expected to be used to fine-tune governmental dietary recommendation programs which are designed to help protect public health.

== Essentiality ==
Copper is an essential trace element (i.e., micronutrient) that is required for plant, animal, and human health. It is also required for the normal functioning of aerobic (oxygen-requiring) microorganisms.

Copper's essentiality was first discovered in 1928, when it was demonstrated that rats fed a copper-deficient milk diet were unable to produce sufficient red blood cells. The anemia was corrected by the addition of copper-containing ash from vegetable or animal sources.

=== Fetuses, infants, and children ===
Human milk is relatively low in copper, and the neonate's liver stores fall rapidly after birth, supplying copper to the fast-growing body during the breast feeding period. These supplies are necessary to carry out such metabolic functions as cellular respiration, melanin pigment and connective tissue synthesis, iron metabolism, free radical defense, gene expression, and the normal functioning of the heart and immune systems in infants.

Since copper availability in the body is hindered by an excess of iron and zinc intake, pregnant women prescribed iron supplements to treat anemia or zinc supplements to treat colds should consult physicians to be sure that the prenatal supplements they may be taking also have nutritionally-significant amounts of copper.

When newborn babies are breastfed, the babies' livers and the mothers' breast milk provide sufficient quantities of copper for the first 4–6 months of life. When babies are weaned, a balanced diet should provide adequate sources of copper.

Cow's milk and some older infant formulas are depleted in copper. Most formulas are now fortified with copper to prevent depletion.

Most well-nourished children have adequate intakes of copper. Health-compromised children, including those who are premature, malnourished, have low birth weights, develop infections, and who experience rapid catch-up growth spurts, are at elevated risk for copper deficiencies. Fortunately, diagnosis of copper deficiency in children is clear and reliable once the condition is suspected. Supplements under a physician's supervision usually facilitate a full recovery.

=== Homeostasis ===
Copper is absorbed, transported, distributed, stored, and excreted in the body according to complex homeostatic processes which ensure a constant and sufficient supply of the micronutrient while simultaneously avoiding excess levels. If an insufficient amount of copper is ingested for a short period of time, copper stores in the liver will be depleted. Should this depletion continue, a copper health deficiency condition may develop. If too much copper is ingested, an excess condition can result. Both of these conditions, deficiency and excess, can lead to tissue injury and disease. However, due to homeostatic regulation, the human body is capable of balancing a wide range of copper intakes for the needs of healthy individuals.

Many aspects of copper homeostasis are known at the molecular level. Copper's essentiality is due to its ability to act as an electron donor or acceptor as its oxidation state fluxes between Cu^{1+}(cuprous) and Cu^{2+} (cupric). As a component of about a dozen cuproenzymes, copper is involved in key redox (i.e., oxidation-reduction) reactions in essential metabolic processes such as mitochondrial respiration, synthesis of melanin, and cross-linking of collagen. Copper is an integral part of the antioxidant enzyme copper-zinc superoxide dismutase, and has a role in iron homeostasis as a cofactor in ceruloplasmin. A list of some key copper-containing enzymes and their functions is summarized below:

Key copper-containing enzymes and their functions
Enzymes	Function
Amine oxidases	Group of enzymes oxidizing primary amines (e.g., tyramine, histidine and polylamines)
Ceruloplasmin (ferroxidase I)	Multi-copper oxidase in plasma, essential for iron transport
Cytochrome c oxidase	Terminal oxidase enzyme in mitochondrial respiratory chain, involved in electron transport
Dopamine beta-hydroxylase	Involved in catecholamine metabolism, catalyzes conversion of dopamine to norepinephrine
Hephaestin	Multi-copper ferroxidase, involved in iron transport across intestinal mucosa into portal circulation
Lysyl oxidase	Cross-linking of collagen and elastin
Peptidylglycine alpha-amidating mono-oxygenase (PAM)	Multifunction enzyme involved in maturation and modification of key neuropeptides (e.g., neurotransmitters, neuroendocrine peptides)
Superoxide dismutase (Cu, Zn)	Intracellular and extracellular enzyme involved in defense against reactive oxygen species (e.g., destruction of superoxide radicals)
Tyrosinase	Enzyme catalyzing melanin and other pigment production

The transport and metabolism of copper in living organisms is currently the subject of much active research. Copper transport at the cellular level involves the movement of extracellular copper across the cell membrane and into the cell by specialized transporters. In the bloodstream, copper is carried throughout the body by albumin, ceruloplasmin, and other proteins. The majority of blood copper (or serum copper) is bound to ceruloplasmin. The proportion of ceruloplasmin-bound copper can range from 70 to 95% and differs between individuals, depending, for example, on hormonal cycle, season, and copper status. Intracellular copper is routed to sites of synthesis of copper-requiring enzymes and to organelles by specialized proteins called metallochaperones. Another set of these transporters carries copper into subcellular compartments. Certain mechanisms exist to release copper from the cell. Specialized transporters return excess unstored copper to the liver for additional storage and/or biliary excretion. These mechanisms ensure that free unbound toxic ionic copper is unlikely to exist in the majority of the population (i.e., those without genetic copper metabolism defects).

=== Absorption ===
In mammals copper is absorbed in the stomach and small intestine, although there appear to be differences among species with respect to the site of maximal absorption. Copper is absorbed from the stomach and duodenum in rats and from the lower small intestine in hamsters. The site of maximal copper absorption is not known for humans, but is assumed to be the stomach and upper intestine because of the rapid appearance of ^{64}Cu in the plasma after oral administration.

Absorption of copper ranges from 15 to 97%, depending on copper content, form of the copper, and composition of the diet.

Various factors influence copper absorption. For example, copper absorption is enhanced by ingestion of animal protein, citrate, and phosphate. Copper salts, including copper gluconate, copper acetate, and copper sulfate, are easily absorbed. copper oxides is not absorbed. Elevated levels of dietary zinc, as well as cadmium, high intakes of phytate and simple sugars (fructose, sucrose) inhibit dietary absorption of copper. Furthermore, low levels of dietary copper appear to inhibit iron absorption.

Some forms of copper are not soluble in stomach acids and cannot be absorbed from the stomach or small intestine. Also, some foods may contain indigestible fiber that binds with copper. High intakes of zinc can significantly decrease copper absorption. Extreme intakes of vitamin C or iron can also affect copper absorption, reminding us of the fact that micronutrients need to be consumed as a balanced mixture. This is one reason why extreme intakes of any one single micronutrient are not advised. Individuals with chronic digestive problems may be unable to absorb sufficient amounts of copper, even though the foods they eat are copper-rich.

Several copper transporters have been identified that can move copper across cell membranes. Other intestinal copper transporters may exist. Intestinal copper uptake may be catalyzed by Ctr1. Ctr1 is expressed in all cell types so far investigated, including enterocytes, and it catalyzes the transport of Cu+1 across the cell membrane.

Excess copper (as well as other heavy metal ions like zinc or cadmium) may be bound by metallothionein and sequestered within intracellular vesicles of enterocytes (i.e., predominant cells in the small intestinal mucosa).

=== Distribution ===
Copper released from intestinal cells moves to the serosal (i.e., thin membrane lining) capillaries where it binds to albumin, glutathione, and amino acids in the portal blood. There is also evidence for a small protein, transcuprein, with a specific role in plasma copper transport Several or all of these copper-binding molecules may participate in serum copper transport. Copper from portal circulation is primarily taken up by the liver. Once in the liver, copper is either incorporated into copper-requiring proteins, which are subsequently secreted into the blood. Most of the copper (70 – 95%) excreted by the liver is incorporated into ceruloplasmin, the main copper carrier in blood. Copper is transported to extra-hepatic tissues by ceruloplasmin, albumin and amino acids, or excreted into the bile. By regulating copper release, the liver exerts homeostatic control over extra-hepatic copper.

=== Excretion ===
Bile is the major pathway for the excretion of copper and is vitally important in the control of liver copper levels. Most fecal copper results from biliary excretion; the remainder is derived from unabsorbed copper and copper from desquamated mucosal cells.

Postulated Spectrum of Copper Metabolism
Dose range	Approximate daily intakes	Health outcomes
		Death
		Gross dysfunction and disturbance of metabolism of other nutrients; hepatic "detoxification" and homeostasis overwhelmed
Toxic	>5.0 mg/kg body weight	Gastrointestinal metallothionein induced (possible differing effects of acute and chronic exposure)
	100 μg/kg body weight	Plateau of absorption maintained; homeostatic mechanisms regulate absorption of copper
Adequate	34 μg/kg body weight	Hepatic uptake, sequestration and excretion effect homeostasis; glutathione-dependent uptake of copper; binding to metallothionein; and lysosomal excretion of copper
	11 μg/kg body weight	Biliary excretion and gastrointestinal uptake normal
	9 μg/kg body weight	Hepatic deposit(s) reduced; conservation of endogenous copper; gastrointestinal absorption increased
Deficient	8.5 μg/kg body weight	Negative copper balance
	5.2 μg/kg body weight	Functional defects, such as lysyl oxidase and superoxide dismutase activities reduced; impaired substrate metabolism
	2 μg/kg body weight	Peripheral pools disrupted; gross dysfunction and disturbance of metabolism of other nutrients; death

== Dietary recommendations ==
Various national and international organizations concerned with nutrition and health have standards for copper intake at levels judged to be adequate for maintaining good health. These standards are periodically changed and updated as new scientific data become available. The standards sometimes differ among countries and organizations.

=== Adults ===
The World Health Organization recommends a minimal acceptable intake of approximately 1.3 mg/day. These values are considered to be adequate and safe for most of the general population. In North America, the U.S. Institute of Medicine (IOM) set the Recommended Dietary Allowance (RDA) for copper for healthy adult men and women at 0.9 mg/day. As for safety, the IOM also sets Tolerable upper intake levels (ULs) for vitamins and minerals when evidence is sufficient. In the case of copper, the UL is set at 10 mg/day. The European Food Safety Authority reviewed the same safety question and set its UL at 5 mg/day.

=== Adolescents, children, and infants ===
Full-term and premature infants are more sensitive to copper deficiency than adults. Since the fetus accumulates copper during the last 3 months of pregnancy, infants that are born prematurely have not had sufficient time to store adequate reserves of copper in their livers and therefore require more copper at birth than full-term infants.

For full-term infants, the North American recommended safe and adequate intake is approximately 0.2 mg/day. For premature babies, it is considerably higher: 1 mg/day. The World Health Organization has recommended similar minimum adequate intakes and advises that premature infants be given formula supplemented with extra copper to prevent the development of copper deficiency.

=== Pregnant and lactating women ===
In North America, the IOM has set the RDA for pregnancy at 1.0 mg/day and for lactation at 1.3 mg/day. The European Food Safety Authority (EFSA) refers to the collective set of information as Dietary Reference Values, with Population Reference Intake (PRI) instead of RDA. PRI for pregnancy is 1.6 mg/day, for lactation 1.6 mg/day – higher than the U.S. RDAs.

== Food sources ==
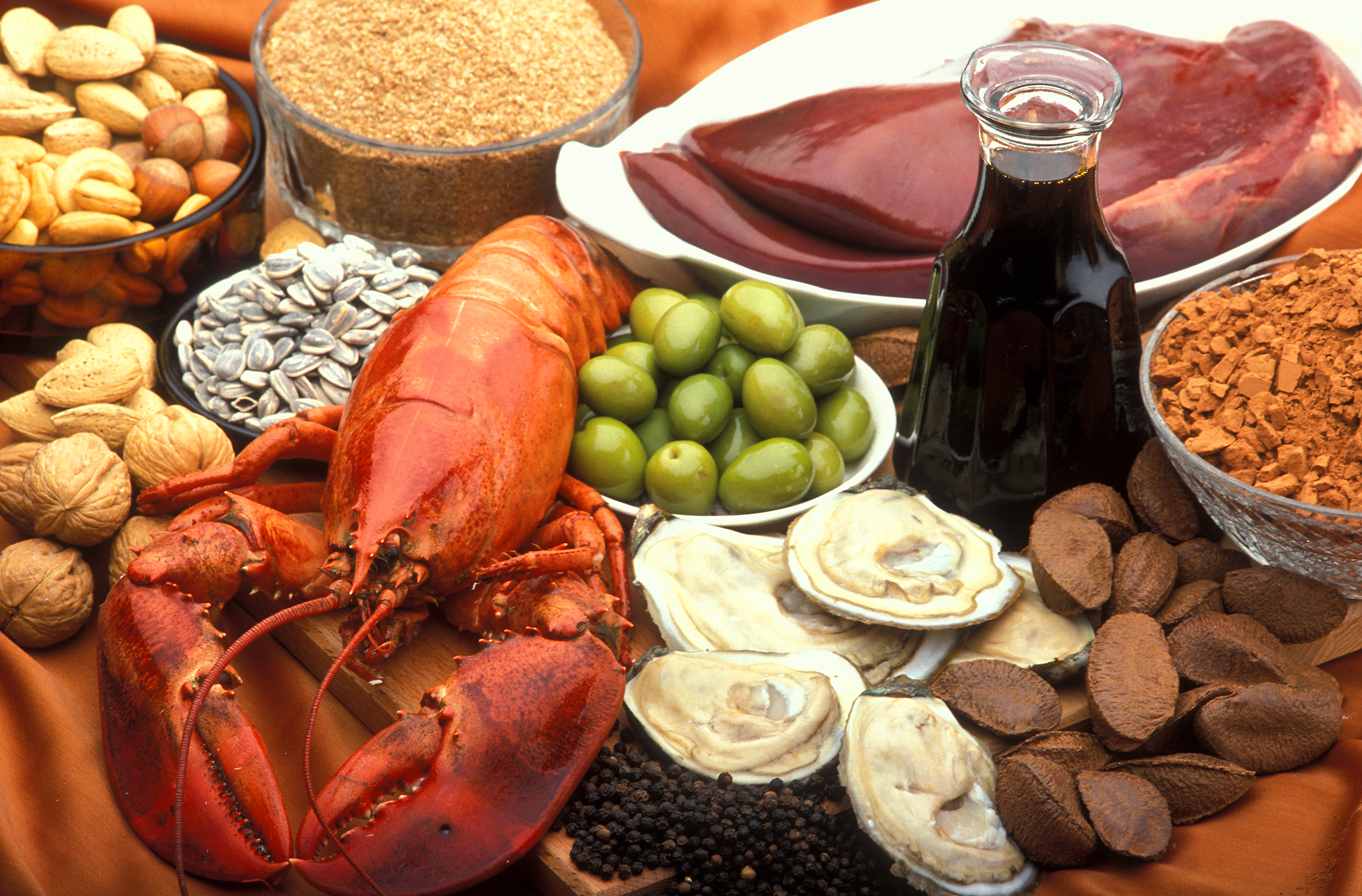
Foods rich in copper

Foods contribute virtually all of the copper consumed by humans.

In both developed and developing countries, adults, young children, and adolescents who consume diets of grain, millet, tuber, or rice along with legumes (beans) or small amounts of fish or meat, some fruits and vegetables, and some vegetable oil are likely to obtain adequate copper if their total food consumption is adequate in calories. In developed countries where consumption of red meat is high, copper intake may also be adequate.

As a natural element in the Earth's crust, copper exists in most of the world's surface water and groundwater, although the actual concentration of copper in natural waters varies geographically. Drinking water can comprise 20–25% of dietary copper.

In many regions of the world, copper tubing that conveys drinking water can be a source of dietary copper. Copper tube can leach a small amount of copper, particularly in its first year or two of service. Afterwards, a protective surface usually forms on the inside of copper tubes that slows leaching.

In France and some other countries, copper bowls are traditionally used for whipping egg white, as the copper helps stabilise bonds in the white as it is beaten and whipped. Small amounts of copper may leach from the bowl during the process and enter the egg white.

=== Supplementation ===
Copper supplements can prevent copper deficiency. Copper supplements are not prescription medicines, and are available at vitamin and herb stores and grocery stores and online retailers. Different forms of copper supplementation have different absorption rates. For example, the absorption of copper from cupric oxide supplements is lower than that from copper gluconate, copper sulfate, or carbonate.

Supplementation is generally not recommended for healthy adults who consume a well-balanced diet which includes a wide range of foods. However, supplementation under the care of a physician may be necessary for premature infants or those with low birth weights, infants fed unfortified formula or cow's milk during the first year of life, and malnourished young children. Physicians may consider copper supplementation for 1) illnesses that reduce digestion (e.g., children with frequent diarrhea or infections; alcoholics), 2) insufficient food consumption (e.g., the elderly, the infirm, those with eating disorders or on diets), 3) patients taking medications that block the body's use of copper, 4) anemia patients who are treated with iron supplements, 5) anyone taking zinc supplements, and 6) those with osteoporosis.

Many popular vitamin supplements include copper as small inorganic molecules such as cupric oxide. These supplements can result in excess free copper in the brain as the copper can cross the blood-brain barrier directly. Normally, organic copper in food is first processed by the liver which keeps free copper levels under control.

== Copper deficiency and excess health conditions (non-genetic) ==
If insufficient quantities of copper are ingested, copper reserves in the liver will become depleted and a copper deficiency leading to disease or tissue injury (and in extreme cases, death). Toxicity from copper deficiency can be treated with a balanced diet or supplementation under the supervision of a doctor. On the contrary, like all substances, excess copper intake at levels far above World Health Organization limits can become toxic. Acute copper toxicity is generally associated with accidental ingestion. These symptoms abate when the high copper food source is no longer ingested.

In 1996, the International Program on Chemical Safety, a World Health Organization-associated agency, stated "there is greater risk of health effects from deficiency of copper intake than from excess copper intake". This conclusion was confirmed in recent multi-route exposure surveys.

The health conditions of non-genetic copper deficiency and copper excess are described below.

=== Copper deficiency ===
There are conflicting reports on the extent of deficiency in the U.S. One review indicates approximately 25% of adolescents, adults, and people over 65, do not meet the Recommended Dietary Allowance for copper. Another source states less common: a federal survey of food consumption determined that for women and men over the age of 19, average consumption from foods and beverages was 1.11 and 1.54 mg/day, respectively. For women, 10% consumed less than the Estimated Average Requirement; for men, fewer than 3%.

Acquired copper deficiency has recently been implicated in adult-onset progressive myeloneuropathy and in the development of severe blood disorders including myelodysplastic syndrome. Fortunately, copper deficiency can be confirmed by very low serum metal and ceruloplasmin concentrations in the blood.

Other conditions linked to copper deficiency include osteoporosis, osteoarthritis, rheumatoid arthritis, cardiovascular disease, colon cancer, and chronic conditions involving bone, connective tissue, heart and blood vessels. nervous system and immune system. Copper deficiency alters the role of other cellular constituents involved in antioxidant activities, such as iron, selenium, and glutathione, and therefore plays an important role in diseases in which oxidant stress is elevated. A marginal, i.e., 'mild' copper deficiency, believed to be more widespread than previously thought, can impair human health in subtle ways.

Populations susceptible to copper deficiency include those with genetic defects for Menkes disease, low-birth-weight infants, infants fed cow's milk instead of breast milk or fortified formula, pregnant and lactating mothers, patients receiving total parenteral nutrition, individuals with "malabsorption syndrome" (impaired dietary absorption), diabetics, individuals with chronic diseases that result in low food intake, such as alcoholics, and persons with eating disorders. The elderly and athletes may also be at higher risk for copper deficiency due to special needs that increase the daily requirements. Vegetarians may have decreased copper intake due to the consumption of plant foods in which copper bioavailability is low. On the other hand, Bo Lönnerdal commented that Gibson's study showed that vegetarian diets provided larger quantities of copper. Fetuses and infants of severely copper deficient women have increased risk of low birth weights, muscle weaknesses, and neurological problems. Copper deficiencies in these populations may result in anemia, bone abnormalities, impaired growth, weight gain, frequent infections (colds, flu, pneumonia), poor motor coordination, and low energy.

=== Copper excess ===
Copper excess is a subject of much current research. Distinctions have emerged from studies that copper excess factors are different in normal populations versus those with increased susceptibility to adverse effects and those with rare genetic diseases. This has led to statements from health organizations that could be confusing to the uninformed. For example, according to a U.S. Institute of Medicine report, the intake levels of copper for a significant percentage of the population are lower than recommended levels. On the other hand, the U.S. National Research Council concluded in its report Copper in Drinking Water that there is concern for copper toxicity in susceptible populations and recommended that additional research be conducted to identify and characterize copper-sensitive populations.

Excess copper intake causes stomach upset, nausea, and diarrhea and can lead to tissue injury and disease.

The oxidation potential of copper may be responsible for some of its toxicity in excess ingestion cases. At high concentrations copper is known to produce oxidative damage to biological systems, including peroxidation of lipids or other macromolecules.

While the cause and progression of Alzheimer's disease are not well understood, research indicates that, among several other key observations, iron, aluminum, and copper accumulate in the brains of Alzheimer's patients. However, it is not yet known whether this accumulation is a cause or a consequence of the disease.

Research has been ongoing over the past two decades to determine whether copper is a causative or a preventive agent of Alzheimer's disease. For example, as a possible causative agent or an expression of a metal homeostasis disturbance, studies indicate that copper may play a role in increasing the growth of protein clumps in Alzheimer's disease brains, possibly by damaging a molecule that removes the toxic buildup of amyloid beta (Aβ) in the brain. There is an association between a diet rich in copper and iron together with saturated fat and Alzheimer's disease. On the other hand, studies also demonstrate potential beneficial roles of copper in treating rather than causing Alzheimer's disease. For example, copper has been shown to 1) promote the non-amyloidogenic processing of amyloid beta precursor protein (APP), thereby lowering amyloid beta (Aβ) production in cell culture systems 2) increase lifetime and decrease soluble amyloid production in APP transgenic mice, and 3) lower Aβ levels in cerebral spinal fluid in Alzheimer's disease patients.

Furthermore, long-term copper treatment (oral intake of 8 mg copper (Cu-(II)-orotate-dihydrate)) was excluded as a risk factor for Alzheimer's disease in a noted clinical trial on humans and a potentially beneficial role of copper in Alzheimer's disease has been demonstrated on cerebral spinal fluid levels of Aβ42, a toxic peptide and biomarker of the disease. More research is needed to understand metal homeostasis disturbances in Alzheimer's disease patients and how to address these disturbances therapeutically. Since this experiment used Cu-(II)-orotate-dihydrate, it does not relate to the effects of cupric oxide in supplements.

=== Copper toxicity from excess exposures ===
In humans, the liver is the primary organ of copper-induced toxicity. Other target organs include bone and the central nervous and immune systems. Excess copper intake also induces toxicity indirectly by interacting with other nutrients. For example, excess copper intake produces anemia by interfering with iron transport and/or metabolism.

The identification of genetic disorders of copper metabolism leading to severe copper toxicity (i.e., Wilson disease) has spurred research into the molecular genetics and biology of copper homeostasis (for further information, refer to the following section on copper genetic diseases). Much attention has focused on the potential consequences of copper toxicity in normal and potentially susceptible populations. Potentially susceptible subpopulations include hemodialysis patients and individuals with chronic liver disease. Recently, concern was expressed about the potential sensitivity to liver disease of individuals who are heterozygote carriers of Wilson disease genetic defects (i.e., those having one normal and one mutated Wilson copper ATPase gene) but who do not have the disease (which requires defects in both relevant genes). However, to date, no data are available that either support or refute this hypothesis.

=== Acute exposures ===
In case reports of humans intentionally or accidentally ingesting high concentrations of copper salts (doses usually not known but reported to be 20–70 grams of copper), a progression of symptoms was observed including abdominal pain, headache, nausea, dizziness, vomiting and diarrhea, tachycardia, respiratory difficulty, hemolytic anemia, hematuria, massive gastrointestinal bleeding, liver and kidney failure, and death.

Episodes of acute gastrointestinal upset following single or repeated ingestion of drinking water containing elevated levels of copper (generally above 3–6 mg/L) are characterized by nausea, vomiting, and stomach irritation. These symptoms resolve when copper in the drinking water source is reduced.

Three experimental studies were conducted that demonstrate a threshold for acute gastrointestinal upset of approximately 4–5 mg/L in healthy adults, although it is not clear from these findings whether symptoms are due to acutely irritant effects of copper and/or to metallic, bitter, salty taste. In an experimental study with healthy adults, the average taste threshold for copper sulfate and chloride in tap water, deionized water, or mineral water was 2.5–3.5 mg/L. This is just below the experimental threshold for acute gastrointestinal upset.

=== Chronic exposures ===
The long-term toxicity of copper has not been well studied in humans, but it is infrequent in normal populations that do not have a hereditary defect in copper homeostasis.

There is little evidence to indicate that chronic human exposure to copper results in systemic effects other than liver injury. Chronic copper poisoning leading to liver failure was reported in a young adult male with no known genetic susceptibility who consumed 30–60 mg/d of copper as a mineral supplement for 3 years. Individuals residing in U.S. households supplied with tap water containing >3 mg/L of copper exhibited no adverse health effects.

No effects of copper supplementation on serum liver enzymes, biomarkers of oxidative stress, and other biochemical endpoints have been observed in healthy young human volunteers given daily doses of 6 to 10 mg/d of copper for up to 12 weeks. Infants aged 3–12 months who consumed water containing 2 mg Cu/L for 9 months did not differ from a concurrent control group in gastrointestinal tract (GIT) symptoms, growth rate, morbidity, serum liver enzyme and bilirubin levels, and other biochemical endpoints.) Serum ceruloplasmin was transiently elevated in the exposed infant group at 9 months and similar to controls at 12 months, suggesting homeostatic adaptation and/or maturation of the homeostatic response.

Dermal exposure has not been associated with systemic toxicity but anecdotal reports of allergic responses may be a sensitization to nickel and cross-reaction with copper or a skin irritation from copper. Workers exposed to high air levels of copper (resulting in an estimated intake of 200 mg Cu/d) developed signs suggesting copper toxicity (e.g., elevated serum copper levels, hepatomegaly). However, other co-occurring exposures to pesticidal agents or in mining and smelting may contribute to these effects. Effects of copper inhalation are being thoroughly investigated by an industry-sponsored program on workplace air and worker safety. This multi-year research effort is expected to be finalized in 2011.

=== Measurements of elevated copper status ===
Although a number of indicators are useful in diagnosing copper deficiency, there are no reliable biomarkers of copper excess resulting from dietary intake. The most reliable indicator of excess copper status is liver copper concentration. However, measurement of this endpoint in humans is intrusive and not generally conducted except in cases of suspected copper poisoning. Increased serum copper or ceruolplasmin levels are not reliably associated with copper toxicity as elevations in concentrations can be induced by inflammation, infection, disease, malignancies, pregnancy, and other biological stressors. Levels of copper-containing enzymes, such as cytochrome c oxidase, superoxide dismutase, and diaminase oxidase, vary not only in response to copper state but also in response to a variety of other physiological and biochemical factors and therefore are inconsistent markers of excess copper status.

A new candidate biomarker for copper excess as well as deficiency has emerged in recent years. This potential marker is a chaperone protein, which delivers copper to the antioxidant protein SOD1 (copper, zinc superoxide dismutase). It is called "copper chaperone for SOD1" (CCS), and excellent animal data supports its use as a marker in accessible cells (e.g., erythrocytes) for copper deficiency as well as excess. CCS is currently being tested as a biomarker in humans.

== Hereditary copper metabolic diseases ==
Several rare genetic diseases (Wilson disease, Menkes disease, idiopathic copper toxicosis, Indian childhood cirrhosis) are associated with the improper use of copper in the body. All of these diseases involve mutations of genes containing the genetic codes for the production of specific proteins involved in the absorption and distribution of copper. When these proteins are dysfunctional, copper either builds up in the liver or the body fails to absorb copper.

These diseases are inherited and cannot be acquired. Adjusting copper levels in the diet or drinking water will not cure these conditions (although therapies are available to manage symptoms of genetic copper excess disease).

The study of genetic copper metabolism diseases and their associated proteins are enabling scientists to understand how human bodies use copper and why it is important as an essential micronutrient.

The diseases arise from defects in two similar copper pumps, the Menkes and the Wilson Cu-ATPases. The Menkes ATPase is expressed in tissues like skin-building fibroblasts, kidneys, placenta, brain, gut and vascular system, while the Wilson ATPase is expressed mainly in the liver, but also in mammary glands and possibly in other specialized tissues. This knowledge is leading scientists towards possible cures for genetic copper diseases.

=== Menkes disease ===
Menkes disease, a genetic condition of copper deficiency, was first described by John Menkes in 1962. It is a rare X-linked disorder that affects approximately 1/200,000 live births, primarily boys. Livers of Menkes disease patients cannot absorb essential copper needed for patients to survive. Death usually occurs in early childhood: most affected individuals die before the age of 10 years, although several patients have survived into their teens and early 20s.

The protein produced by the Menkes gene is responsible for transporting copper across the gastrointestinal tract (GIT) mucosa and the blood–brain barrier. Mutational defects in the gene encoding the copper ATPase cause copper to remain trapped in the lining of the small intestine. Hence, copper cannot be pumped out of the intestinal cells and into the blood for transport to the liver and consequently to rest of the body. The disease therefore resembles a severe nutritional copper deficiency despite adequate ingestion of copper.

Symptoms of the disease include coarse, brittle, depigmented hair and other neonatal problems, including the inability to control body temperature, intellectual disability, skeletal defects, and abnormal connective tissue growth.

Menkes patients exhibit severe neurological abnormalities, apparently due to the lack of several copper-dependent enzymes required for brain development, including reduced cytochrome c oxidase activity. The brittle, kinky hypopigmented hair of steely appearance is due to a deficiency in an unidentified cuproenzyme. Reduced lysyl oxidase activity results in defective collagen and elastin polymerization and corresponding connective-tissue abnormalities including aortic aneurisms, loose skin, and fragile bones.

With early diagnosis and treatment consisting of daily injections of copper histidine intraperitoneally and intrathecally to the central nervous system, some of the severe neurological problems may be avoided and survival prolonged. However, Menkes disease patients retain abnormal bone and connective-tissue disorders and show mild to severe intellectual disability. Even with early diagnosis and treatment, Menkes disease is usually fatal.

Ongoing research into Menkes disease is leading to a greater understanding of copper homeostasis, the biochemical mechanisms involved in the disease, and possible ways to treat it. Investigations into the transport of copper across the blood/brain barrier, which are based on studies of genetically altered mice, are designed to help researchers understand the root cause of copper deficiency in Menkes disease. The genetic makeup of transgenic mice is altered in ways that help researchers garner new perspectives about copper deficiency. The research to date has been valuable: genes can be turned off gradually to explore varying degrees of deficiency.

Researchers have also demonstrated in test tubes that damaged DNA in the cells of a Menkes patient can be repaired. In time, the procedures needed to repair damaged genes in the human body may be found.

=== Wilson's disease ===
Wilson's disease is a rare autosomal (chromosome 13) recessive genetic disorder of copper transport that causes an excess of copper to build up in the liver. This results in liver toxicity, among other symptoms. The disease is now treatable.

Wilson's disease is produced by mutational defects of a protein that transports copper from the liver to the bile for excretion. The disease involves poor incorporation of copper into ceruloplasmin and impaired biliary copper excretion and is usually induced by mutations impairing the function of the Wilson copper ATPase. These genetic mutations produce copper toxicosis due to excess copper accumulation, predominantly in the liver and brain and, to a lesser extent, in kidneys, eyes, and other organs.

The disease, which affects about 1/30,000 infants of both genders, may become clinically evident at any time from infancy through early adulthood. The age of onset of Wilson's disease ranges from 3 to 50 years of age. Initial symptoms include hepatic, neurologic, or psychiatric disorders and, rarely, kidney, skeletal, or endocrine symptomatology. The disease progresses with deepening jaundice and the development of encephalopathy, severe clotting abnormalities, occasionally associated with intravascular coagulation, and advanced chronic kidney disease. A peculiar type of tremor in the upper extremities, slowness of movement, and changes in temperament become apparent. Kayser–Fleischer rings, a rusty brown discoloration at the outer rims of the iris due to copper deposition noted in 90% of patients, become evident as copper begins to accumulate and affect the nervous system.

Almost always, death occurs if the disease is untreated. Fortunately, identification of the mutations in the Wilson ATPase gene underlying most cases of Wilson's disease has made DNA testing for diagnosis possible.

If diagnosed and treated early enough, patients with Wilson's disease may live long and productive lives. Wilson's disease is managed by copper chelation therapy with D-penicillamine (which picks up and binds copper and enables patients to excrete excess copper accumulated in the liver), therapy with zinc sulfate or zinc acetate, and restrictive dietary metal intake, such as the elimination of chocolate, oysters, and mushrooms. Zinc therapy is now the treatment of choice. Zinc produces a mucosal block by inducing metallothionein, which binds copper in mucosal cells until they slough off and are eliminated in the feces. and it competes with copper for absorption in the intestine by DMT1 (Divalent Metal transporter 1). More recently, experimental treatments with tetrathiomolybdate showed promising results. Tetrathiomolybdate appears to be an excellent form of initial treatment in patients who have neurologic symptoms. In contrast to penicillamine therapy, initial treatment with tetrathiomolybdate rarely allows further, often irreversible, neurologic deterioration.

Over 100 different genetic defects leading to Wilson's disease have been described and are available on the Internet at . Some of the mutations have geographic clustering.

Many Wilson's patients carry different mutations on each chromosome 13 (i.e., they are compound heterozygotes). Even in individuals who are homozygous for a mutation, onset and severity of the disease may vary. Individuals homozygous for severe mutations (e.g., those truncating the protein) have earlier disease onset. Disease severity may also be a function of environmental factors, including the amount of copper in the diet or variability in the function of other proteins that influence copper homeostasis.

It has been suggested that heterozygote carriers of the Wilson's disease gene mutation may be potentially more susceptible to elevated copper intake than the general population. A heterozygotic frequency of 1/90 people has been estimated in the overall population. However, there is no evidence to support this speculation. Further, a review of the data on single-allelic autosomal recessive diseases in humans does not suggest that heterozygote carriers are likely to be adversely affected by their altered genetic status.

=== Other copper-related hereditary syndromes ===
Other diseases in which abnormalities in copper metabolism appear to be involved include Indian childhood cirrhosis (ICC), endemic Tyrolean copper toxicosis (ETIC), and idiopathic copper toxicosis (ICT), also known as non-Indian childhood cirrhosis. ICT is a genetic disease recognized in the early twentieth century primarily in the Tyrolean region of Austria and in the Pune region of India.

ICC, ICT, and ETIC are infancy syndromes that are similar in their apparent etiology and presentation. Both appear to have a genetic component and a contribution from elevated copper intake.

In cases of ICC, the elevated copper intake is due to heating and/or storing milk in copper or brass vessels. ICT cases, on the other hand, are due to elevated copper concentrations in water supplies. Although exposures to elevated concentrations of copper are commonly found in both diseases, some cases appear to develop in children who are exclusively breastfed or who receive only low levels of copper in water supplies. The currently prevailing hypothesis is that ICT is due to a genetic lesion resulting in impaired copper metabolism combined with high copper intake. This hypothesis was supported by the frequency of occurrence of parental consanguinity in most of these cases, which is absent in areas with elevated copper in drinking water and in which these syndromes do not occur.

ICT appears to be vanishing as a result of greater genetic diversity within the affected populations in conjunction with educational programs to ensure that tinned cooking utensils are used instead of copper pots and pans being directly exposed to cooked foods. The preponderance of cases of early childhood cirrhosis identified in Germany over a period of 10 years were not associated with either external sources of copper or with elevated hepatic metal concentrations Only occasional spontaneous cases of ICT arise today.

== Cancer ==
The role of copper in angiogenesis associated with different types of cancers has been investigated. A copper chelator, tetrathiomolybdate, which depletes copper stores in the body, is under investigation as an anti-angiogenic agent in pilot and clinical trials. The drug may inhibit tumor angiogenesis in hepatocellular carcinoma, pleural mesothelioma, colorectal cancer, head and neck squamous cell carcinoma, breast cancer, and kidney cancer. The copper complex of a synthetic salicylaldehyde pyrazole hydrazone (SPH) derivative induced human umbilical endothelial cell (HUVEC) apoptosis and showed anti-angiogenesis effect in vitro.

The trace element copper had been found promoting tumor growth. Several evidence from animal models indicates that tumors concentrate high levels of copper. Meanwhile, extra copper has been found in some human cancers. Recently, therapeutic strategies targeting copper in the tumor have been proposed. Upon administration with a specific copper chelator, copper complexes would be formed at a relatively high level in tumors. Copper complexes are often toxic to cells, therefore tumor cells were killed, while normal cells in the whole body remained alive for the lower level of copper. Researchers have also recently found that cuproptosis, a copper-induced mechanism of mitochondrial-related cell death, has been implicated as a breakthrough in the treatment of cancer and has become a new treatment strategy.

Some copper chelators get more effective or novel bioactivity after forming copper-chelator complexes. It was found that Cu2+ was critically needed for PDTC induced apoptosis in HL-60 cells. The copper complex of salicylaldehyde benzoylhydrazone (SBH) derivatives showed increased efficacy of growth inhibition in several cancer cell lines, when compared with the metal-free SBHs.

SBHs can react with many kinds of transition metal cations and thereby forming a number of complexes. Copper-SBH complexes were more cytotoxic than complexes of other transitional metals (Cu > Ni > Zn = Mn > Fe = Cr > Co) in MOLT-4 cells, an established human T-cell leukemia cell line. SBHs, especially their copper complexes appeared to be potent inhibitors of DNA synthesis and cell growth in several human cancer cell lines, and rodent cancer cell lines.

Salicylaldehyde pyrazole hydrazone (SPH) derivatives were found to inhibit the growth of A549 lung carcinoma cells. SPH has identical ligands for Cu^{2+} as SBH. The Cu-SPH complex was found to induce apoptosis in A549, H322 and H1299 lung cancer cells.

== Contraception with copper IUDs ==
A copper intrauterine device (IUD) is a type of long-acting reversible contraception that is considered to be one of the most effective forms of birth control.

== Plant and animal health ==
In addition to being an essential nutrient for humans, copper is vital for the health of animals and plants and plays an important role in agriculture.

=== Plant health ===
Copper concentrations in soil are not uniform around the world. In many areas, soils have insufficient levels of copper. Soils that are naturally deficient in copper often require copper supplements before agricultural crops, such as cereals, can be grown.

Copper deficiencies in soil can lead to crop failure. Copper deficiency is a major issue in global food production, resulting in losses in yield and reduced quality of output. Nitrogen fertilizers can worsen copper deficiency in agricultural soils.

The world's two most important food crops, rice and wheat, are highly susceptible to copper deficiency. So are several other important foods, including citrus, oats, spinach and carrots. On the other hand, some foods including coconuts, soybeans and asparagus, are not particularly sensitive to copper-deficient soils.

The most effective strategy to counter copper deficiency is to supplement the soil with copper, usually in the form of copper sulfate. Sewage sludge is also used in some areas to replenish agricultural land with organics and trace metals, including copper.

=== Animal health ===
In livestock, cattle and sheep commonly show indications when they are copper deficient. Swayback, a sheep disease associated with copper deficiency, imposes enormous costs on farmers worldwide, particularly in Europe, North America, and many tropical countries. For pigs, copper has been shown to be a growth promoter.

== See also ==
- Dietary mineral
- Essential nutrient
- List of micronutrients
- Micronutrients
- Nutrition
