= Copper toxicity =

Type of metal poisoning

- Other names: Copperiedus
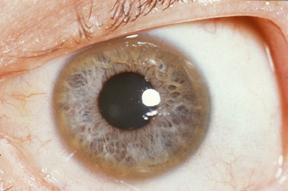
- A Kayser–Fleischer ring, copper deposits found in the cornea, is an indication the body is not metabolizing copper properly.
- Specialty: Toxicology

Copper toxicity (or Copperiedus) is a type of metal poisoning caused by an excess of copper in the body. Copperiedus could occur from consuming excess copper salts, but most commonly it is the result of the genetic condition Wilson's disease and Menke's disease, which are associated with mismanaged transport and storage of copper ions. Copper is essential to human health as it is a component of many proteins, but hypercupremia (high copper level in the blood) can lead to copper toxicity if it persists and rises high enough.

Chronic toxicity by copper is rare. The suggested safe level of copper in drinking water for humans varies depending on the source, but tends to be pegged at 1.3 mg/L. So low is the toxicity of copper that copper(II) sulfate is a routine reagent in undergraduate chemistry laboratories.

== Signs and symptoms ==
Acute symptoms of copper poisoning by ingestion include vomiting, hematemesis (vomiting of blood), hypotension (low blood pressure), melena (black "tarry" feces), coma, jaundice (yellowish pigmentation of the skin), and gastrointestinal distress. Individuals with glucose-6-phosphate dehydrogenase deficiency may be at increased risk of hematologic effects of copper. Hemolytic anemia resulting from the treatment of burns with copper compounds is infrequent.

Chronic (long-term) copper exposure can damage the liver and kidneys. Mammals have efficient mechanisms to regulate copper stores such that they are generally protected from excess dietary copper levels. The biological half-life of copper in human is about 13–33 days, with excess copper excreted primarily through the bile into feces, and small amounts can be excreted through urine, saliva, and perspiration.

Those same protection mechanisms can cause milder symptoms, which are often misdiagnosed as psychiatric disorders. There is a lot of research on the function of the Cu/Zn ratio in neurological, endocrinological, and psychological conditions. Many of the substances that protect humans from excess copper perform important functions in the neurological and endocrine systems, leading to diagnostic difficulties. When they are used to bind copper in the plasma, to prevent it from being absorbed in the tissues, their own function may go unfulfilled. Such symptoms often include mood swings, irritability, depression, fatigue, excitation, difficulty focusing, and feeling out of control. To further complicate diagnosis, some symptoms of excess copper are similar to those of a copper deficit.

The U.S. Environmental Protection Agency's Maximum Contaminant Level (MCL) in drinking water is 1.3 milligrams per liter. The MCL for copper is based on the expectation that a lifetime of consuming copper in water at this level is without adverse effect (gastrointestinal). The US EPA lists copper as a micronutrient and a toxin. Toxicity in mammals includes a wide range of animals and effects such as liver cirrhosis, necrosis in kidneys and the brain, gastrointestinal distress, lesions, low blood pressure, and fetal mortality. The Occupational Safety and Health Administration (OSHA) has set a limit of 0.1 mg/m^{3} for copper fumes (vapor generated from heating copper) and 1 mg/m^{3} for copper dusts (fine metallic copper particles) and mists (aerosol of soluble copper) in workroom air during an eight-hour work shift, 40-hour work week. Toxicity to other species of plants and animals is noted to varying levels.

=== EPA cancer data ===
The EPA lists no evidence for human cancer incidence connected with copper, and lists animal evidence linking copper to cancer as "inadequate". Two studies in mice have shown no increased incidence of cancer. One of these used regular injections of copper compounds, including cupric oxide. One study of two strains of mice fed copper compounds found a varying increased incidence of reticulum cell sarcoma in males of one strain, but not the other (there was a slightly increased incidence in females of both strains). These results have not been repeated.

== Pathophysiology ==
=== Indian childhood cirrhosis ===
One manifestation of copper toxicity, cirrhosis of the liver in children (Indian childhood cirrhosis), has been linked to boiling milk in copper cookware. The Merck Manual states that recent studies suggest that a genetic defect is associated with this particular cirrhosis.

=== Wilson's disease ===
An inherited condition called Wilson's disease causes the body to retain copper, since it is not excreted by the liver into the bile. This disease, if untreated, can lead to brain and liver damage, and bis-choline tetrathiomolybdate is under investigation as a therapy against Wilson's disease.

=== Menke's disease ===
An X-linked recessive trait that is inherited named Menke's disease causes disruption of connective tissue due to mutations in genes. If severely affected the approximate span of life is three years. One treatment used to correct the mutation is copper-histidine treatment.

=== Alzheimer's disease ===
Elevated free copper levels exist in Alzheimer's disease, which has been hypothesized to be linked to inorganic copper consumption. Copper and zinc are known to bind to amyloid beta proteins in Alzheimer's disease. This bound form is thought to mediate the production of reactive oxygen species in the brain.

== Diagnosis ==
=== ICD-9-CM ===
ICD-9-CM code 985.8 Toxic effect of other specified metals includes acute and chronic copper poisoning (or other toxic effect) whether intentional, accidental, industrial etc.

In addition, it includes poisoning and toxic effects of other metals including tin, selenium, nickel, iron, heavy metals, thallium, silver, lithium, cobalt, aluminum and bismuth. Some poisonings, e.g. zinc phosphide, would/could also be included as well as under 989.4 Poisoning due to other pesticides, etc.

Excluded are toxic effects of mercury, arsenic, manganese, beryllium, antimony, cadmium, and chromium.

=== ICD-10-CM ===
Code	Term
T56.4X1D	Toxic effect of copper and its compounds, accidental (unintentional), subsequent encounter
T56.4X1S	Toxic effect of copper and its compounds, accidental (unintentional), sequela
T56.4X2D	Toxic effect of copper and its compounds, intentional self-harm, subsequent encounter
T56.4X2S	Toxic effect of copper and its compounds, intentional self-harm, sequela
T56.4X3D	Toxic effect of copper and its compounds, assault, subsequent encounter
T56.4X3S	Toxic effect of copper and its compounds, assault, sequela
T56.4X4D	Toxic effect of copper and its compounds, undetermined, subsequent encounter
T56.4X4S	Toxic effect of copper and its compounds, undetermined, sequela

=== SNOMED ===
Concept ID	Term
46655005	Copper
43098002	Copper fever
49443005	Phytogenous chronic copper poisoning
50288007	Chronic copper poisoning
73475009	Hepatogenous chronic copper poisoning
875001	Chalcosis of eye
90632001	Acute copper poisoning

== Treatment ==
In cases of suspected copper poisoning, penicillamine is the drug of choice, and dimercaprol, a heavy metal chelating agent, is often administered. Vinegar is not recommended to be given, as it assists in solubilizing insoluble copper salts. The inflammatory symptoms are to be treated on general principles, as are the nervous ones. Treatment can also look like ozone oxidation for environmental toxicity problems, as well as removing sediment in water areas because sediment can be a home for toxicants to reside.

There is some evidence that alpha-lipoic acid (ALA) may work as a milder chelator of tissue-bound copper. Alpha lipoic acid is also being researched for chelating other heavy metals, such as mercury.

== Aquatic life ==
Too much copper in water may damage marine and freshwater organisms such as fish and molluscs. Fish species vary in their sensitivity to copper, with the LD50 for 96-h exposure to copper sulfate reported to be in the order of 58 mg per litre for Tilapia (Oreochromis niloticus) and 70 mg per litre for catfish (Clarias gariepinus) The chronic effect of sublethal concentrations of copper on fish and other creatures is damage to gills, liver, kidneys and the nervous system. It also interferes with the sense of smell in fish, thus preventing them from choosing good mates or finding their way to mating areas.

Copper-based paint is a common marine antifouling agent. In the United States, copper-based paint replaced tributyltin, which was banned due to its toxicity, as a way for boats to control organic growth on their hulls. In 2011, Washington state became the first U.S. state to ban the use of copper-based paint for boating, although it only applied to recreational boats. California has also pursued initiatives to reduce the effect of copper leaching, with the U.S. EPA pursuing research.

Copper is an essential elemental for metabolic processes in marine algae. It is required for electron transport in photosynthesis and by various enzyme systems. Too much copper can also affect phytoplankton or marine algae in both marine and freshwater ecosystems. It has been shown to inhibit photosynthesis, disrupt electron transport in photosystem 2, reduce pigment concentrations, restrict growth, reduce reproduction, etc. The toxicity of copper is widely recognized and is used to help prevent algal blooms. The effect of copper is solely dependent on the free copper the water is receiving. It's determined by the relative solubility and the concentration of the copper binding ligands.

Studies have shown that copper concentrations are toxic when marine phytoplankton are confined to areas that are heavily impacted by anthropogenic emissions. Some of the studies have used a marine amphipod to show how copper affects it. This particular study said that the juveniles were 4.5 more times sensitive to the toxins than the adults. Another study used 7 different algal species. They found that one species was more sensitive than the others, which was Synechococcus, and that another species was more sensitive in seawater, which was Thalassiosira weissflogii.

One study used cyanobacteria, diatoms, coccolithophores, and dinoflagellates. This study showed that cyanobacteria was the most sensitive, diatoms were the least sensitive, and the coccolithophores and dinoflagellates were intermediate. They used copper ion in a buffer system and controlled it at different levels. They found that cyanobacteria reproduction rates were reduced while other algae had maximum reproduction rates. They found that Copper may influence seasonal successions of species.

== Bacteria ==
Copper and copper alloys such as brass have been found to be toxic to bacteria via the oligodynamic effect. The exact mechanism of action is unknown, but common to other heavy metals. Viruses are less susceptible to this effect than bacteria. Associated applications include the use of brass doorknobs in hospitals, which have been found to self-disinfect after eight hours, and mineral sanitizers, in which copper can act as an algicide. Overuse of copper sulfate as an algicide has been speculated to have caused a copper poisoning epidemic on Great Palm Island in 1979.
