= HealthCap =

Venture capital firm

- Company type: Private
- Industry: Venture Capital
- Founded: 1996
- Headquarters: Stockholm, Sweden and Lausanne, Switzerland
- Total assets: EUR 1 billion
- Number of employees: Approximately 25 (2023)
- Website: www.healthcap.eu

HealthCap is a specialized provider of venture capital within life sciences. HealthCap invests in innovative companies with focus on therapeutics. As of 2023, HealthCap has invested in over 125 companies since inception and completed initial public offerings of more than 45 companies. HealthCap has offices in Stockholm and Lausanne.

== History ==
The firm was founded in 1996 by Björn Odlander and Peder Fredrikson, and the first fund was started the same year. As of 2023, HealthCap has established eight funds and financed more than 125 companies, where more than 45 have been taken public on nine different markets. The most recent fund, HealthCap VIII, was established in 2019. HealthCap has approximately 25 employees out of which thirteen are partners. The team combines venture capital investing experience with competences and work experiences from small as well as large companies across the healthcare industry, spanning disciplines of scientific research, drug development, clinical practice, investment banking, and industry management.

== Investments ==
HealthCap has raised eight main funds. Investors in HealthCap funds include, among others, European Investment Fund, Skandia Life Insurance, the 4th and 6th Swedish National Pension Funds, The Kresge Foundation, Mayo Clinic, Northwestern University, University of Michigan, Vanderbilt University and Washington University. HealthCap has committed capital exceeding EUR 1 billion.

HealthCap invests in companies developing disruptive technologies that hold the potential to change clinical practice. Over the years HealthCap has invested in more than 125 companies. The portfolio companies have developed more than 20 pharmaceutical products and over 40 med-tech products to the market. Many of these products, such as Firazyr®, Xofigo®, Tracleer®, are breakthrough therapies addressing life-threatening diseases. Examples of technologies financed by HealthCap are:

- (Switzerland) Pulmonary hypertension therapy developed by Actelion. The company was acquired by J&J in 2017.
- (Norway) Xofigo® developed by Algeta for treatment of bone metastasis in prostate cancer.
- (United States) A range of drugs in development for rare and ultra-rare genetic diseases by Ultragenyx.
- (Sweden) Restylane, an injectable filler developed by Q-Med. The company was acquired by Galderma in 2011.
- (United States) Trans-femoral aortic valve replacement developed by CoreValve that evades the need for open heart surgery when replacing a malfunctioning heart valve.
- (Sweden) Injectable synthetic bone substitute, Cerament, to enhance bone remodeling and fracture healing developed by BoneSupport AB.
- (Sweden) WTX101, an orphan drug currently in development by Wilson Therapeutics for the treatment of Wilson's disease. Wilson Therapeutics was acquired by Alexion in 2018.
