= Metallate =

Metallate or metalate is the name given to any complex anion containing a metal ligated to two or more atoms and/or groups of atoms.

Typically, the metal is one of the transition elements and the ligand is oxygen or another chalcogenide, a cyanide group or a halogen (though others are known).

The chalcogenide metallates are known as oxometallates, thiometallates, selenometallates and tellurometallates; the cyanide metallates are known as cyanometallates; the halogenide metalates are known as halogenometallates.

Oxometallates include permanganate MnO^{−}_{4}, chromate CrO^{2−}_{4}, vanadate VO^{−}_{3} or VO^{3−}_{4} and tungstate WO^{2−}_{4}.

Thiometallates include tetrathiovanadate VS^{3−}_{4}, tetrathiomolybdate MoS^{2−}_{4}, tetrathiotungstate WS^{2−}_{4}and similar ions.

Cyanometallates include ferricyanide [Fe(CN)_{6}]^{3−}, ferrocyanide [Fe(CN)_{6}]^{4−} and dicyanoargentate(I) [Ag(CN)_{2}]^{−}.

Halogenometallates include tetrachloroaluminate [AlCl_{4}]^{−}, tetrachloronickelate(II) [NiCl_{4}]^{2−} and hexafluoroplatinate(V) [PtCl_{6}]^{−}.

Others include tetranitratoaluminate [Al(NO_{3})_{4}]^{−} and tetrahydroxozincate [Zn(OH)_{4}]^{2−}.

Metallate is also used as a verb by bioinorganic chemistry to describe the act of adding metal atoms or ions to a site (synthetic ligand or protein).

== See also ==
- Polyoxometalate
- Heteropolymetalate
