= Bonesupport =

Swedish biotechnology company

BoneSupport AB is a Swedish biotech company active at the Ideon Science Park in the university town of Lund in Skåne, Sweden, founded in 1999 by Lars Lidgren, Professor of Orthopedic Surgery and Academic Head of Department at Lund University Hospital in Sweden which is a member of the ISOC group of orthopaedic centers. The company has been funded with more than SEK 500 million in venture capital from inter alia HealthCap, Lundbeck foundation and Industrifonden, making it one of the largest ventures in the Swedish medical technologies industry.

== Cerament ==
Cerament is a synthetic, injectable, osteoconductive biomaterial, which actively promotes bone healing and is utilized as a bone substitute, when bone grafting is needed. Full remodeling to healthy bone occurs between 6 and 12 months.

Cerament is used for the treatment of fragility fractures caused by Osteoporosis, to fill bone voids or gaps caused by trauma or orthopedic surgical procedures for e.g., benign tumors, and for augmentation of fracture repair. Cerament can be loaded with antibiotics like Gentamicin (Cerament with gentamicin is not FDA approved), thereby protecting bone healing in patients with bone infections (osteomyelitis)

Cerament bone void filler received approval by the U.S. Food and Drug Administration (FDA) for sale in the United States in 2005 and CE-marking in 2009. Cerament spine support received its CE mark in 2008.

In September 2012, BoneSupport entered a distribution agreement with the major medical device manufacturer Biomet who have exclusive distribution rights of the Cerament bone void filler product range in the United States of America and Canada. This agreement is expected to accelerate the usage of Bonesupport's bone void filler (Cerament) product line in orthopaedic operations.

In May 2018 Bonesupport ended their U.S. distribution agreement with ZimmerBiomet which dated back to 2012. They took back distribution in the US market and now work through a network of independent distributors.

Cerament G was named a breakthrough device in 2020 and 2021 by the FDA. The Fortify IDE study completed follow up in 2021 and will be filed with the FDA in Q4 2022. Cerament G has been approved in Europe dating back to 2013.

== Initial public offering (IPO) ==
On 11 June 2017, BoneSupport AB's Board of Directors applied for the company's shares to be admitted to trading on Nasdaq Stockholm's main market. Nasdaq Stockholm approved the Company's application subject to customary conditions. The first day of trading in the Company's shares was on 21 June 2017.
