= Algeta =

Norwegian pharmaceutical company

Algeta ASA
- Company type: Acquired by Bayer AG in December 2013
- Industry: Biotechnology
- Founded: 1997
- Headquarters: Oslo, Norway
- Products: Xofigo
- Website: Bayer.no

Algeta ASA (ALGETA:NO) was founded in 1997 by Roy H. Larsen and Øyvind S. Bruland in Oslo, Norway as a private biotechnology and pharmaceutical company. The company’s research and development focus lies in the field of alpha-particle emitting radiopharmaceuticals. The lead product of the company, Xofigo is the first marketed alpha-particle emitting radiopharmaceutics for cancer treatment.

== Early fund raising ==
Algeta raised its series A financing round in 2005 with a total amount of €23 million. The financing round was led by new investors HealthCap, Advent Venture and SR One.

== Public offering ==
In March 2007, the company went public and traded in the Oslo Stock Exchange under the ticker symbol ALGETA and raised $41 million.

== Xofigo ==
Algeta’s lead product Xofigo (radium Ra 223 dichloride, radium-223, previously called Alpharadin) is a radiotherapeutic drug which is supplied as injectable sterile solution. The active ingredient alpha particle emitting isotope radium-223 mimics calcium and forms complexes with hydroxyapatite at areas where increased bone turnover takes place, such as cancer bone metastasis. The product received U.S. Food and Drug Administration (FDA) and European Medicines Agency (EMA) approval in May 2013 and November 2013, respectively, to treat castration-resistant prostate cancer, symptomatic bone metastases and unknown visceral metastatic disease. The FDA approval was based on a double-blind, randomized, placebo-controlled phase III clinical trial of 809 patients with castration-resistant prostate cancer and symptomatic bone metastases. The trial was designed to measure overall survival. Interim analysis revealed 14 months median overall survival in the Xofigo group as compared to 11.2 months in the placebo group. The data were later confirmed by updated exploratory analysis showing Xofigo improved overall survival.

== Algeta Bayer deals ==
In September 2009, Algeta and Bayer AG anchored a development and commercialization deal for Xofigo with the total deal size of $800 million. In December 2013, Bayer offered a full acquisition of Algeta for $2.9 billion. The largest shareholder HealthCap pre-approved the deal which was completed in March 2014.
