= Tetrathiomolybdate =

Tetrathiomolybdate, also spelled tiomolibdate (USAN), is the anion of the following salts:

- Ammonium tetrathiomolybdate, a building block in bioinorganic chemistry
- Bis-choline tetrathiomolybdate, a drug for the treatment of Wilson's disease
