= Blue nails =

Azure lunula

Blue nails, or more formally azure lunula, are characterized by a blue discoloration of the lunulae, seen in argyria and cases of hepatolenticular degeneration (Wilson's disease), also having been reported in hemoglobin M disease and hereditary acrolabial telangiectases.

In Wilson's disease the blue color involves the lunula (most intense pigmentation) and fades proximally. In argyria, the nail is permanently pigmented a slate-blue color and is most evident in the lunula. Minocycline can also turn the nail plate blue-gray.

== See also ==
- Nail anatomy
- Nail diseases
- Wilson's disease
