= UTP4 =

Protein-coding gene in humans

Identifiers
- Aliases: UTP4, CIRHIN, NAIC, TEX292, CIRH1A, small subunit processome component, UTP4 small subunit processome component
- External IDs: OMIM: 607456; MGI: 1096573; GeneCards: UTP4

Gene location (Human)
Chr.	Chromosome 16 (human)
Band	16q22.1	Start	69,131,291 bp
Band	16q22.1	End	69,231,130 bp

Gene location (Mouse)
Chr.	Chromosome 8 (mouse)
Band	8|8 D3	Start	107,620,268 bp
Band	8|8 D3	End	107,649,720 bp
RNA expression pattern
Bgee	Human / Mouse (ortholog); Top expressed in: gonad; gastrocnemius muscle; human kidney; right testis; left testis; skeletal muscle tissue; muscle of thigh; stromal cell of endometrium; testicle; islet of Langerhans / Top expressed in: primary oocyte; epiblast; primitive streak; Gonadal ridge; morula; morula; embryo; fetal liver hematopoietic progenitor cell; tail of embryo; maxillary prominence; More reference expression data
BioGPS	n/a
Gene ontology
Molecular function	protein binding; RNA binding
Cellular component	fibrillar center; nucleolus; nucleus; t-UTP complex; chromosome; nucleoplasm; 90S preribosome; small-subunit processome
Biological process	regulation of transcription, DNA-templated; maturation of SSU-rRNA; transcription, DNA-templated; rRNA processing; ribosome biogenesis; maturation of SSU-rRNA from tricistronic rRNA transcript (SSU-rRNA, 5.8S rRNA, LSU-rRNA)
Sources:Amigo / QuickGO
Orthologs
Databases	NCBI: entry; OMA: entry
Species	Human	Mouse
Entrez	84916	21771
Ensembl	ENSG00000262788; ENSG00000141076	ENSMUSG00000041438
UniProt	Q969X6	Q8R2N2
RefSeq (mRNA)	NM_032830; NM_001318391	NM_011574; NM_001358982
RefSeq (protein)	NP_001305320; NP_116219	NP_035704; NP_001345911
Location (UCSC)	Chr 16: 69.13 – 69.23 Mb	Chr 8: 107.62 – 107.65 Mb
PubMed search
- Wikidata
View/Edit Human	View/Edit Mouse

UTP4 is a gene that encodes the protein Cirhin, the gene is also known as CIRH1A and NAIC. This protein contains a WD40 repeat and is localized to the nucleolus where it colocates with UTP15 and WDR43. Biallelic mutations to UTP4 have been associated with North American Indian childhood cirrhosis, a form of inherited cirrhosis of the liver occurring in American Indian children from the Abitibi region of northern Quebec.
