= Wilson Therapeutics =

Swedish biopharmaceutical company

Wilson Therapeutics AB
- Company type: Public company
- Traded as: OMX: WTX
- Industry: Pharmaceutical industry
- Founded: 2012
- Headquarters: Stockholm, Sweden
- Products: Decuprate
- Parent: Alexion Pharmaceuticals
- Website: www.wilsontherapeutics.com

Wilson Therapeutics is a biopharmaceutical company, based in Stockholm, Sweden, that develops novel therapies for rare diseases. The company is listed in the Mid-Cap segment on Nasdaq Stockholm with the stock ticker WTX.

Wilson Therapeutics' lead product, Decuprate, is the proprietary bis-choline salt of tetrathiomolybdate. Decuprate is initially being developed as a novel treatment for Wilson's disease, a rare genetic disease that affects approximately 1 in 30,000, causing copper overload in the liver, brain and other tissues and resulting in organ damage and dysfunction. Decuprate has been granted orphan drug designation for the treatment of Wilson's disease in both Europe and the United States. Wilson Therapeutics presented during the 10th Kempen & Co Life Sciences Conference 2017 and showed the world the result with the drug Decuprate. The company also presented during the international investmentconference Bioequity Europe in Paris, France, on May 23, 2017, and showed some promising result.

== Clinical trials ==
As of 2016, tetrathiomolybdate had been tested in over 500 patients for up to seven years, primarily in oncology and Wilson's disease, as well as some other clinical pathologies.

== History ==
Wilson Therapeutics was founded in 2012 by HealthCap, one of the leading European life science venture capital funds. In 2014, Wilson Therapeutics closed a $40 million Series B financing co-led by new investors, Abingworth LLP, MVM Life Science Partners LLP and NeoMed Management AS. HealthCap also participated in the round. On April 29, 2016, Wilson Therapeutics announced its initial public offering on Nasdaq Stockholm and had its first day of trading on May 12, 2016.
