= Face of the giant panda sign =

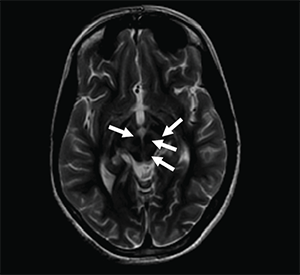
- Axial T2-weighted MRI of the brain at the level of the midbrain showing the characteristic ‘face of the giant panda’ sign, with normal red nuclei and substantia nigra (pars reticulata) against a background of hyperintensity in the tegmentum, as well as hypointensity of the superior colliculi
- Complications: choreoathetosis
- Differential diagnosis: Wilson's disease, Wernicke's encephalopathy, Leigh syndrome, acute disseminated encephalomyelitis, toxic leukoencephalopathy, rabies
- Medication: penicillamine, thiamine, corticosteroids

The face of the giant panda sign, panda sign of the midbrain or double-panda sign is a characteristic "panda's face" appearance in magnetic resonance imaging (MRI) images of people with Wilson's disease. Along with Kayser–Fleischer rings, the sign is helpful in diagnosis.

While the sign is most common in Wilson's disease, it has been rarely reported in acute disseminated encephalomyelitis, rabies encephalopathy, toxic leukoencephalopathy and Leigh syndrome. Additionally, case studies when onset begins after age 40 have found the Face of the Giant Panda Sign associated with B-cell lymphoma, methanol poisoning and other conditions.
