= Ammonium tetrathiovanadate =

Names
- Other names Ammonium tetrathiovanadate(V)

Identifiers
CAS Number	14693-56-2
3D model (JSmol)	Interactive image
- InChI: InChI=1S/3H3N.4S.V/h3*1H3;;;;;/q;;;;3*-1;/p+3 Key: SJFCDLDHOZFGTN-UHFFFAOYSA-Q
- SMILES: [NH4+].[NH4+].[NH4+].[S-][V](=S)([S-])[S-]

Properties
Chemical formula	H_{12}N_{3}S_{4}V
Molar mass	233.30 g·mol^{−1}
Appearance	violet crystals
- Except where otherwise noted, data are given for materials in their standard state (at 25 °C [77 °F], 100 kPa). Infobox references

Ammonium tetrathiovanadate is the inorganic compound with the chemical formula (NH_{4})_{3}VS_{4}. It is a violet solid. The compound is a salt consisting of three ammonium cations and a tetrahedral VS_{4}^{3-} anion.

== Chemical properties ==
Like other ammonium salts, ammonium tetrathiovanadate decomposes when heated:

(NH_{4})_{3}VS_{4} → 6NH_{3}↑ + 3H_{2}S↑ + V_{2}S_{5}
V_{2}S_{5} → V_{2}S_{3} + 2S
