= Tungsten trisulfide =

Names
- Other names Tungsten(VI) sulphide, tris(sulfanylidene)tungsten

Identifiers
CAS Number	12125-19-8
3D model (JSmol)	Interactive image
ChemSpider	9215149
EC Number	235-734-2
PubChem CID	11039977
- InChI: InChI=1S/3S.W Key: YMZATHYBBBKECM-UHFFFAOYSA-N
- SMILES: S=[W](=S)=S

Properties
Chemical formula	WS_{3}
Molar mass	280.038 g/mol
Appearance	Brown solid

Related compounds
Related compounds	Tungsten disulfide
- Except where otherwise noted, data are given for materials in their standard state (at 25 °C [77 °F], 100 kPa). Infobox references

Tungsten trisulfide is an inorganic compound of tungsten and sulfur with the chemical formula WS_{3}. The compound looks like chocolate-brown powder.

== Synthesis ==
1. Bubbling hydrogen sulfide through hot acidified solution of tungstenates.

2. Reaction of tungsten disulfide and elemental sulfur on heating:

WS_{2} + S → WS_{3}

3. Precipitates upon acidification of thiotungstate solutions:

(NH_{4})_{2}WS_{4} + HCl → WS_{3} + 2 NH_{4}Cl + H_{2}S
Na_{2}WS_{4} + H_{2}SO_{4} → WS_{3} + Na_{2}SO_{4} + H_{2}S

== Physical properties ==
Slightly soluble in cold water and forms colloidal solution in hot water.

Soluble in alkali metal carbonates and alkali metal hydroxides.

== Chemical properties ==
Tungsten trisulfide can be decomposed by heating into tungsten disulfide and elemental sulfur:

WS_{3} → WS_{2} + S

Reacts with sulfide solutions:

WS_{3} + (NH_{4})_{2}S → (NH_{4})_{2}WS_{4}

Reduced by hydrogen:

WS_{3} + 3H_{2} → W + 3 H_{2}S
