= North American Indian childhood cirrhosis =

Genetic pediatric liver disease

North American Indian childhood cirrhosis (NAIC) is a disease in humans that can affect Ojibway-Cree children in northwestern Quebec, Canada. The disease is due to an autosomal recessive abnormality of the UTP4 gene, which codes for cirhin, a nucleolar protein.

NAIC is a ribosomopathy. An R565W mutation of UTP4 leads to partial impairment of cirhin interaction with NOL11.

Initial transient neonatal jaundice advances over time to biliary cirrhosis with severe liver fibrosis. Eventually, liver failure occurs, and requires liver transplantation.
