= Ammonium tetrathiotungstate =

Names
- IUPAC name azane;bis(sulfanylidene)tungsten;sulfanide

Identifiers
CAS Number	13862-78-7
3D model (JSmol)	Interactive image
ChemSpider	13547274
ECHA InfoCard	100.156.973
EC Number	628-727-4
PubChem CID	53393497
- InChI: InChI=1S/2H3N.2H2S.2S.W/h2*1H3;2*1H2;;;/p-2 Key: CCFCMIWYHMKPAO-UHFFFAOYSA-L
- SMILES: N.N.[SH-].[SH-].S=[W]=S

Properties
Chemical formula	(NH_{4})_{2}WS_{4}
Molar mass	348.16 g·mol^{−1}
Appearance	yellow to orange crystals
Density	2.71 g/cm^{3} (hydrate)
Solubility in water	soluble

Hazards
- GHS labelling
Pictograms	(GHS07: Exclamation mark)
Signal word	Warning
Hazard statements	H315, H319, H335
Precautionary statements	P264, P280, P302+P352, P321, P332+P313, P362
- Except where otherwise noted, data are given for materials in their standard state (at 25 °C [77 °F], 100 kPa). Infobox references

Ammonium tetrathiotungstate is a chemical compound with the chemical formula (NH_{4})_{2}WS_{4}.

== Synthesis ==
Ammonium tetrathiotungstate can be obtained by the reaction of tungstic acid, ammonia, and hydrogen sulfide in a water bath at 65-70°C:

H_{2}WO_{4} + 2NH_{3}·H_{2}O + 4H_{2}S → (NH_{4})_{2}WS_{4} + 6H_{2}O

== Physical properties ==
Ammonium tetrathiotungstate forms yellow to orange crystals, soluble in water.

The compound decomposes under heat to produce tungsten trisulfide at 170-280°C and tungsten disulfide at 260-500°C.

== Uses ==
The compound is used in materials science and catalysis.
