= Indian childhood cirrhosis =

Chronic liver disease in children

Indian childhood cirrhosis is a chronic liver disease of childhood characterised by cirrhosis of the liver associated with the deposition of copper in the liver. It primarily affects children of 1–3 years of age and has a genetic predisposition. It had a very high case fatality in the past, but has eventually become preventable, treatable "with D-penicillamine in the treatment of 85 biopsy proven cases of Indian childhood cirrhosis", according to the Indian Journal of Pediatrics. "The drug significantly (P< 0.002) reduced the serum and hepatic copper content and simultaneously there was improvement in clinical and symptomatic aspects. This therapy was compared with the conventional corticosteroid therapy."

It remains a part of the differential diagnosis of Wilson's disease.

== See also ==
- North American Indian childhood cirrhosis
