= Wilson's disease =

Genetic disorder

- Other names: Wilson disease, hepatolenticular degeneration
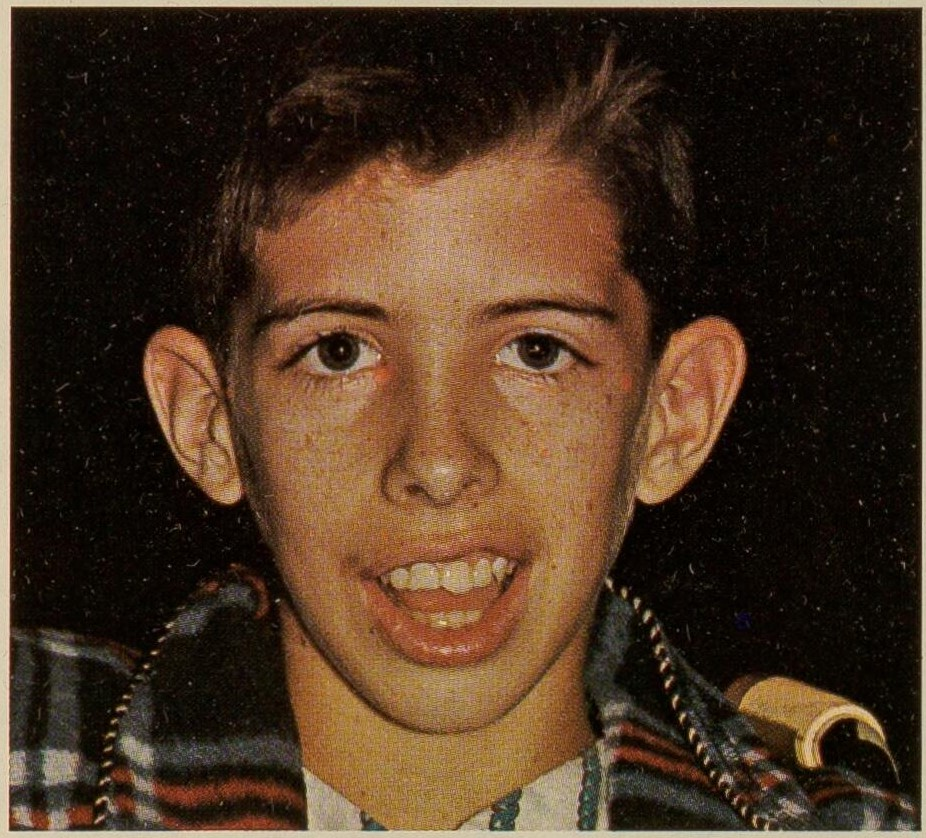
- Specialty: Gastroenterology
- Symptoms: Swelling of the legs, yellowish skin, personality changes
- Usual onset: Age 5 to 35
- Causes: Genetic
- Differential diagnosis: Chronic liver disease, Parkinson's disease, multiple sclerosis, others
- Treatment: Dietary changes, chelating agents, zinc supplements, liver transplant
- Frequency: ~1 per 30,000

Wilson's disease (or Wilson disease; also called hepatolenticular degeneration) is a genetic disorder characterized by the excess build-up of copper in the body. Symptoms are typically related to the brain and liver. Liver-related symptoms include vomiting, weakness, fluid build-up in the abdomen, swelling of the legs, yellowish skin, and itchiness. Brain-related symptoms include tremors, muscle stiffness, trouble in speaking, personality changes, anxiety, and psychosis.

Wilson's disease occurs in about one in 30,000 people. Symptoms usually begin between the ages of 5 and 35 years. It was first described in 1854 by German pathologist Friedrich Theodor von Frerichs and is named after British neurologist Samuel Wilson.

Wilson's disease is caused by a mutation in the Wilson disease protein (ATP7B) gene. This protein transports excess copper into bile, where it is excreted in waste products. The condition is autosomal recessive; for people to be affected, they must inherit a mutated copy of the gene from both parents. Diagnosis may be difficult and often involves a combination of blood tests, urine tests, and a liver biopsy. Genetic testing may be used to screen family members of those affected.

Wilson's disease is typically treated with dietary changes and medication. Dietary changes involve eating a low-copper diet and not using copper cookware. Medications used include chelating agents, such as trientine and D-penicillamine, and zinc supplements. Complications of Wilson's disease can include liver failure and kidney problems. A liver transplant may be helpful to those for whom other treatments are not effective or if liver failure occurs.

== Signs and symptoms ==
The main sites of copper accumulation are the liver and brain. Consequently, liver disease and neuropsychiatric symptoms are the main features that lead to diagnosis. People with liver problems tend to come for medical attention earlier (generally as children or teenagers) than those with neurological and psychiatric symptoms, who tend to be in their 20s or older. Some are identified only because relatives have been diagnosed with Wilson's disease; many of these, when tested, turn out to have been experiencing symptoms of the condition but have not received a diagnosis.

=== Liver disease ===
Liver disease may present itself as tiredness, jaundice, increased bleeding tendency or confusion (due to hepatic encephalopathy), and portal hypertension. The last, a condition in which the pressure in the portal vein is markedly increased, leads to esophageal varices as well as splenomegaly and ascites. On examination, signs of chronic liver disease such as spider angiomata (small, distended blood vessels, usually on the chest) may be observed. Chronic active hepatitis has already caused cirrhosis of the liver in most patients by the time they develop symptoms. While most people with cirrhosis have an increased risk of hepatocellular carcinoma (liver cancer), this risk is relatively low in Wilson's disease.

About 5% of all people are diagnosed only when they develop fulminant acute liver failure, often in the context of hemolytic anemia (anemia due to the destruction of red blood cells). This leads to abnormalities in protein production (identified by deranged coagulation) and metabolism by the liver. The deranged protein metabolism leads to the accumulation of waste products, such as ammonia, in the bloodstream. When these irritate the brain, patients develop hepatic encephalopathy – a serious condition that causes confusion, coma, seizures and, finally, life-threatening swelling of the brain).

=== Neuropsychiatric symptoms ===
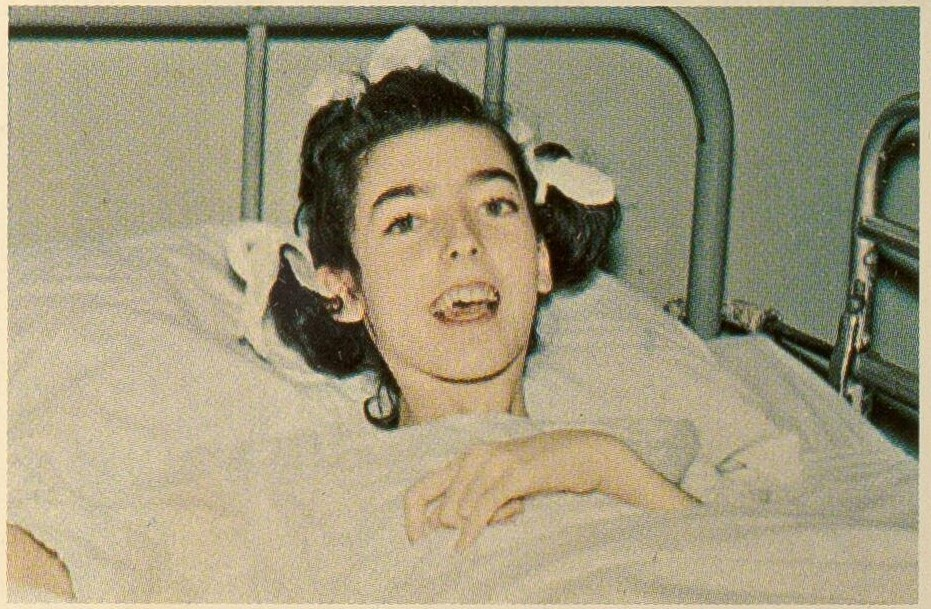
Girl with Wilson's disease showing risus sardonicus

About half of people with Wilson's disease have neurological or psychiatric symptoms. Most initially have mild cognitive deterioration and clumsiness, as well as changes in behavior. Specific neurological symptoms usually then follow, often in the form of parkinsonism (lead-pipe or cogwheel rigidity, bradykinesia, and postural instability) with or without a typical hand tremor, masked facial expressions, slurred speech, ataxia (lack of coordination), or dystonia (twisting and repetitive movements of part of the body). Seizures and migraine appear to be more common in Wilson's disease. A characteristic tremor described as "wing-beating tremor" is encountered in many people with Wilson's; this is absent at rest but can be provoked by abducting the arms and flexing the elbows toward the midline.

Cognition can also be affected in Wilson's disease, in two non-mutually exclusive categories: frontal lobe disorder (may present as impulsivity, impaired judgement, promiscuity, apathy, and executive dysfunction with poor planning and decision-making) and subcortical dementia (may present as slow thinking, memory loss, and executive dysfunction, without signs of aphasia, apraxia, or agnosia). These cognitive involvements are thought to be related and closely linked to psychiatric manifestations of the disease.

Psychiatric problems due to Wilson's disease may include behavioral changes, depression, anxiety disorders, and psychosis. Psychiatric symptoms are commonly seen in conjunction with neurological symptoms and are rarely manifested on their own. These symptoms are often poorly defined and can sometimes be attributed to other causes. Because of this, diagnosis of Wilson's disease is rarely made when only psychiatric symptoms are present.

=== Other organ systems ===
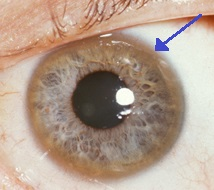
A brown ring on the edge of the iris (Kayser–Fleischer ring) is common in Wilson's disease, especially when neurological symptoms are present.

Medical conditions have been linked with copper accumulation in Wilson's disease:

- Eyes: Kayser–Fleischer rings (KF rings) may be visible in the cornea of the eyes, either directly or on slit lamp examination, as deposits of copper form a ring around the cornea. This is due to copper deposition in Descemet's membrane of the cornea. These rings can be either dark brown, golden, or reddish green, are 1 to 3mm wide, and appear at the corneal limbus. They do not occur in all people with Wilson's disease and may also be seen in people with chronic cholestasis. Wilson's disease is also associated with sunflower cataracts exhibited by brown or green pigmentation of the anterior and posterior lens capsule. Neither causes significant visual loss. KF rings occur in approximately 66% of diagnosed cases (more often in those with neurological symptoms rather than with liver problems).
- Kidneys: renal tubular acidosis (Type 2), a disorder of bicarbonate handling by the proximal tubules leads to nephrocalcinosis (calcium accumulation in the kidneys), a weakening of bones (due to calcium and phosphate loss), and occasionally aminoaciduria (loss of essential amino acids needed for protein synthesis).
- Heart: cardiomyopathy (weakness of the heart muscle) is a rare but recognized problem in Wilson's disease; it may lead to heart failure (fluid accumulation due to decreased pump function) and cardiac arrhythmias (episodes of irregular and/or abnormally fast or slow heart beat).
- Hormones: hypoparathyroidism (failure of the parathyroid glands leading to low calcium levels), panhypopituitarism (leading to decreased production of hormones from the pituitary gland), infertility, and recurrent miscarriage.
- Musculoskeletal: Arthritis and thinning of the bones (osteopenia or osteoporosis).
- Fingers: Blue nails, or more formally Azure Lunula, is seen as a blue colouring fading proximally.
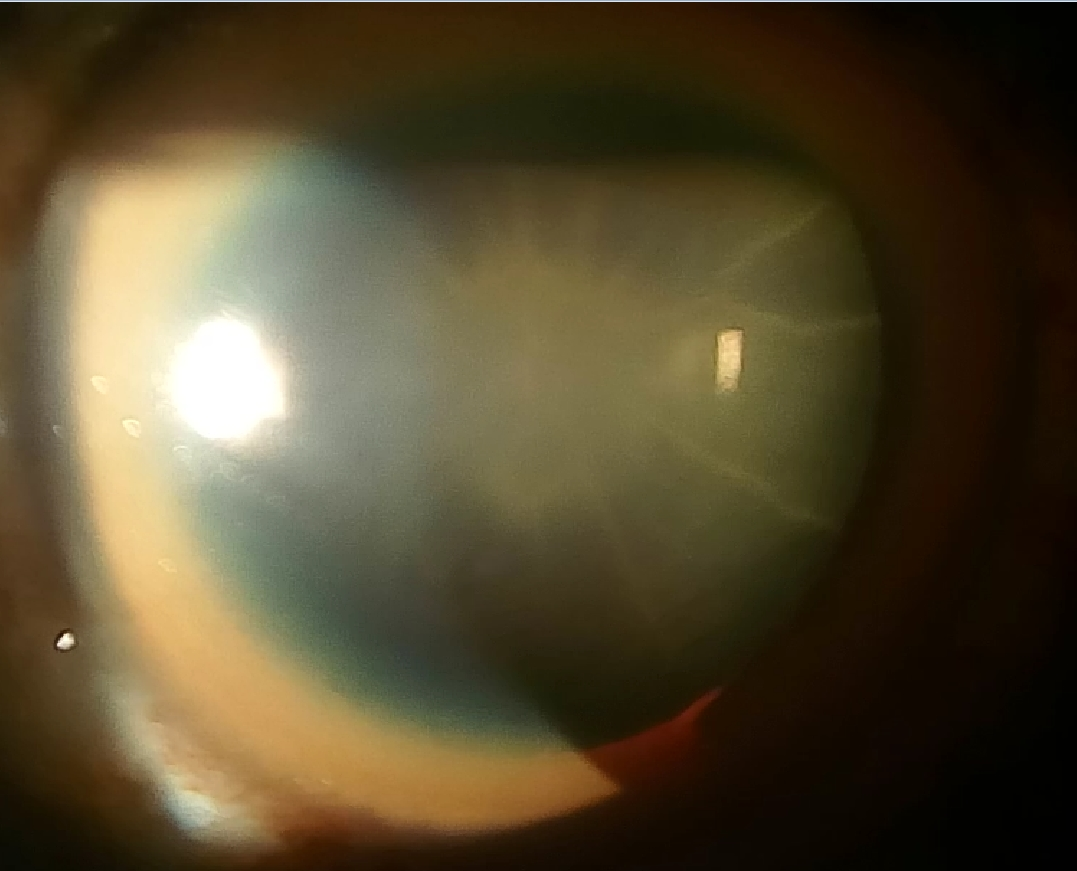
Sunflower cataract and thick KF ring of a 40-year-old male with Wilson's disease and decompensated chronic liver disease

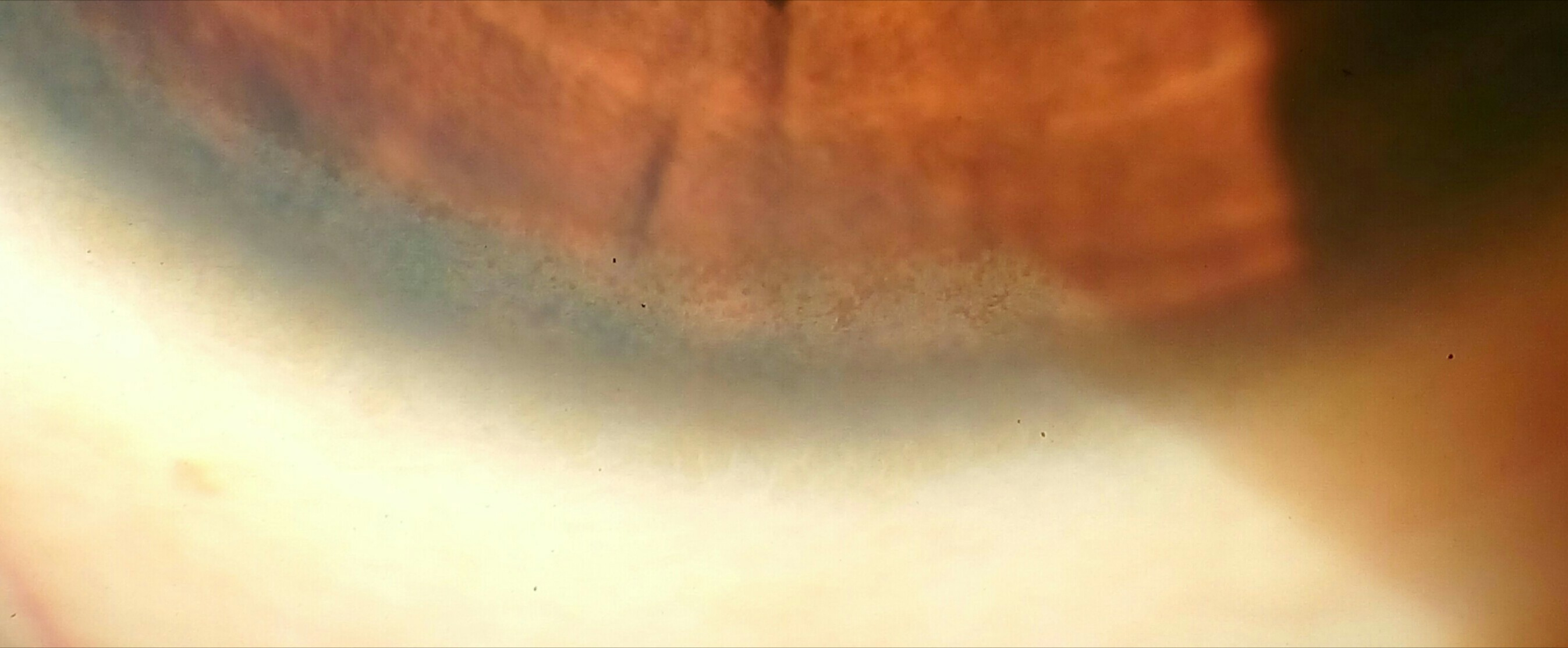
Diffuse illumination of cornea

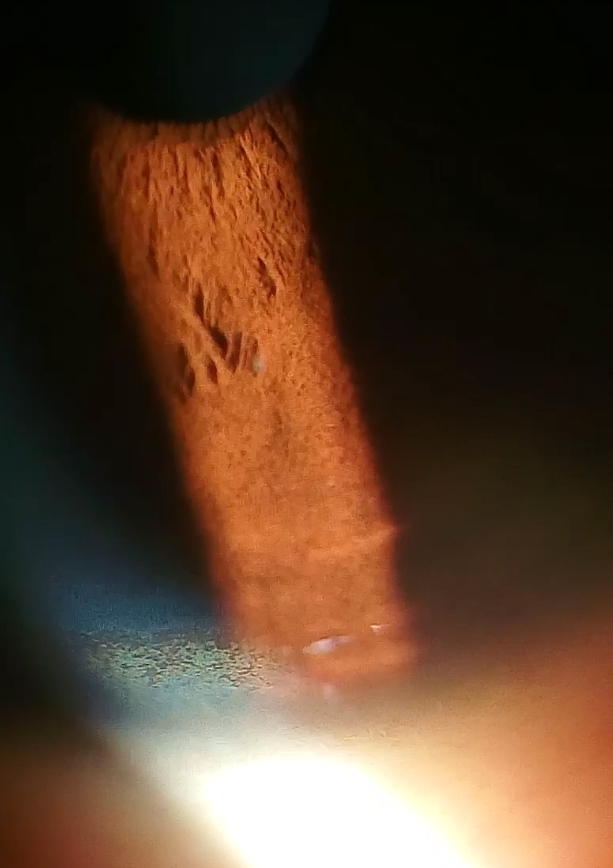
Copper deposition on corneal Descemet's membrane

== Genetics ==
Wilson's disease has an autosomal recessive pattern of inheritance.

The Wilson's disease gene (ATP7B) is on chromosome 13 (13q14.3) and is expressed primarily in the liver, kidney, and placenta. The gene codes for a P-type (cation transport enzyme) ATPase that transports copper into bile and incorporates it into ceruloplasmin. Most people who have Wilson's disease – 60% – are homozygous for ATP7B mutations (two abnormal copies), and 30% of them have only one abnormal copy. In up to 7% of cases, people with Wilson's disease have no detectable mutations.

Although more than 500 mutations of ATP7B have been described, a very small number of those cause most cases of Wilson's disease; which mutation an individual will have tends to be specific to the population they are part of. For instance, in Western populations, the H1069Q mutation (replacement of a histidine by a glutamine at position 1069 in the protein) is present in 37%–63% of cases, while in China this mutation is very uncommon; R778L (arginine to leucine at 778) is found more often there. Relatively little is known about the relative impact of the various mutations, although the H1069Q mutation seems to predict later onset and predominantly neurological problems, according to some studies. A comprehensive clinically annotated resource, WilsonGen, provides a clinical classification for the variants as per the recent ACMG & AMP guidelines.

A normal variation in the PRNP gene can modify the course of the disease by delaying the age of onset and affecting the type of symptoms that develop. This gene produces prion protein, which is active in the brain and other tissues and also appears to be involved in transporting copper. A role for the ApoE gene was initially suspected, but could not be confirmed.

The condition is inherited in an autosomal recessive pattern. To inherit it, both of the parents of an individual must carry an affected gene. Most people with Wilson's disease have no family history of the condition. People with only one abnormal gene are called carriers (heterozygotes) and may have mild, but medically insignificant, abnormalities of copper metabolism.

There are several hereditary diseases that cause copper overload in the liver; Wilson's disease is the most common of them. All can cause cirrhosis at a young age. The other copper overload diseases are Indian childhood cirrhosis (ICC), endemic Tyrolean infantile cirrhosis, and idiopathic copper toxicosis. These three, unlike Wilson's disease, are not related to ATP7B mutations; for example, ICC has been linked to mutations in the KRT8 and the KRT18 genes.

== Pathophysiology ==
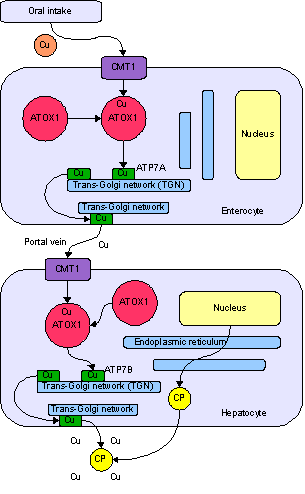
Normal absorption and distribution of copper: Cu = copper, CP = ceruloplasmin, green = ATP7B carrying copper

Copper is needed by the body for a number of functions, predominantly as a cofactor for a number of enzymes such as ceruloplasmin, cytochrome c oxidase, dopamine β-hydroxylase, superoxide dismutase, and tyrosinase.

Copper enters the body through the digestive tract. A transporter protein on the cells of the small bowel, copper membrane transporter 1 (Ctr1; SLC31A1), carries copper inside the cells, where some is bound to metallothionein and part is carried by ATOX1 to an organelle known as the trans-Golgi network. Here, in response to rising concentrations of copper, an enzyme called ATP7A (Menkes' protein) releases copper into the portal vein to the liver. Liver cells also carry the CMT1 protein, and metallothionein and ATOX1 bind it inside the cell, but here, ATP7B links copper to ceruloplasmin and releases it into the bloodstream, as well as removing excess copper by secreting it into bile. Both functions of ATP7B are impaired in Wilson's disease. Copper accumulates in the liver tissue; ceruloplasmin is still secreted, but in a form that lacks copper (termed apo-ceruloplasmin) and is rapidly degraded in the bloodstream.

When the amount of copper in the liver overwhelms the proteins that normally bind it, it causes oxidative damage to the liver through a process known as Fenton chemistry; this damage eventually leads to chronic active hepatitis, fibrosis (deposition of connective tissue), and cirrhosis. The liver also releases copper into the bloodstream that is not bound to ceruloplasmin. This free copper precipitates throughout the body, but particularly in the kidneys, eyes, and brain. In the brain, most copper is deposited in the basal ganglia, particularly in the putamen and globus pallidus (together called the lenticular nucleus); these areas normally participate in the coordination of movement and play a significant role in neurocognitive processes such as the processing of stimuli and mood regulation. Damage to these areas, again by Fenton chemistry, produces the neuropsychiatric symptoms seen in Wilson's disease.

Why Wilson's disease causes hemolysis is unclear, but various lines of evidence suggest that a high level of free (nonceruloplasmin-bound) copper may be directly affecting the oxidation of hemoglobin, or inhibiting the energy-supplying enzymes in red blood cells, or causing direct damage to cell membranes.

== Diagnosis ==
Location of the basal ganglia, the part of the brain affected by Wilson's disease

Wilson's disease may be suspected on the basis of any of the symptoms mentioned above, or when a close relative has been found to have Wilson's. Most have slightly abnormal liver function tests such as raised aspartate transaminase, alanine transaminase, and bilirubin levels. Alkaline phosphatase levels are relatively low in those with Wilson's-related acute liver failure. If the liver damage is significant, albumin may be decreased due to an inability of damaged liver cells to produce this protein; likewise, the prothrombin time (a test of coagulation) may be prolonged as the liver is unable to produce proteins known as clotting factors. If neurological symptoms are seen, magnetic resonance imaging of the brain is usually performed; this shows hyperintensities in the part of the brain called the basal ganglia in the T2 setting. MRI may also demonstrate the characteristic "face of the giant panda" pattern. The diagnosis is often delayed, with an average time from symptom onset to diagnosis of approximately 2 years, though this delay can range from immediate recognition to 30 years, partly due to variable presentation and need for multiple specialized tests.

No totally reliable test for Wilson's disease is known, but levels of ceruloplasmin and copper in the blood, as well of the amount of copper excreted in urine during a 24-hour period, are together used to form an impression of the amount of copper in the body. The most accurate test is a liver biopsy.

=== Ceruloplasmin ===
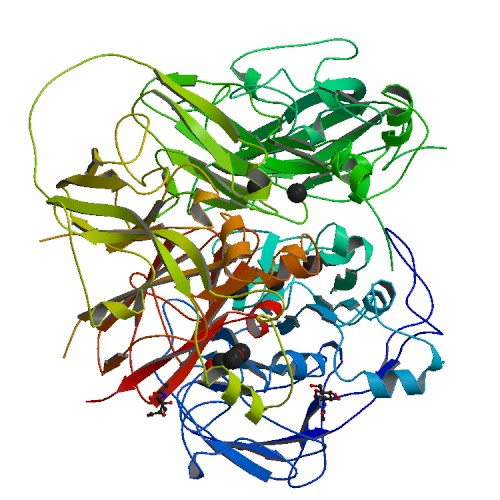
Ceruloplasmin

Levels of ceruloplasmin are abnormally low (<0.2 g/L) in 80–95% of cases. It can be present at normal levels, though, in people with ongoing inflammation, as it is an acute phase protein. Low ceruloplasmin is also found in Menkes disease and aceruloplasminemia, which are related to, but much rarer than Wilson's disease. The combination of neurological symptoms, eye signs, and a low ceruloplasmin level is considered sufficient for the diagnosis of Wilson's disease. In many cases, however, further tests are needed.

=== Serum and urine copper ===
Serum copper is low, which may seem paradoxical given that Wilson's disease is a disease of copper excess. However, 95% of plasma copper is carried by ceruloplasmin, which is often low in Wilson's disease. Urine copper is elevated in Wilson's disease and is collected for 24 hours in a bottle with a copper-free liner. Levels above 100 μg/24h (1.6 μmol/24h) confirm Wilson's disease, and levels above 40 μg/24h (0.6 μmol/24h) are strongly indicative. High urine copper levels are not unique to Wilson's disease; they are sometimes observed in autoimmune hepatitis and in cholestasis (any disease obstructing the flow of bile from the liver to the small bowel).

In children, the following penicillamine test may be used: a 500 mg oral dose of penicillamine is administered, and all urine collected for 24 hours. If the entire day's urine contains more than 1600 μg (25 μmol) of copper, it is a reliable indicator of Wilson's disease. This test has not been validated in adults.

=== Slit-lamp examination ===
The eyes of the patient are examined using a slit lamp to look for Kayser–Fleischer rings, which are strongly associated with Wilson's disease and are caused by copper deposition on the inner cornea in Descemet's membrane.

=== Liver biopsy ===
Once other investigations have indicated Wilson's disease, the ideal test is the removal of a small amount of liver tissue through a liver biopsy. This is assessed microscopically for the degree of steatosis and cirrhosis, and histochemistry and quantification of copper are used to measure the severity of the copper accumulation. A level of 250 μg of copper per gram of dried liver tissue confirms Wilson's disease. Occasionally, lower levels of copper are found; in that case, the combination of the biopsy findings with all other tests could still lead to a formal diagnosis of Wilson's.

In the earlier stages of the disease, the biopsy typically shows steatosis (deposition of fatty material), increased glycogen in the nucleus, and areas of necrosis (cell death). In more advanced disease, the changes observed are quite similar to those seen in autoimmune hepatitis, such as infiltration by inflammatory cells, piecemeal necrosis, and fibrosis (scar tissue). In advanced disease, finally, cirrhosis is the main finding. In acute liver failure, degeneration of the liver cells and collapse of the liver tissue architecture is seen, typically on a background of cirrhotic changes. Histochemical methods for detecting copper are inconsistent and unreliable, and taken alone are regarded as insufficient to establish a diagnosis.

=== Genetic testing ===
Mutation analysis of the ATP7B gene, as well as other genes linked to copper accumulation in the liver, may be performed. Once a mutation is confirmed, family members can be screened for the disease as part of clinical genetics family counseling. Regional distributions of genes associated with Wilson's disease are important to follow, as this can help clinicians design appropriate screening strategies. Since mutations of the ATP7B gene vary between populations, research and genetic testing done in countries such as the USA or United Kingdom can pose problems, as they tend to have more mixed populations.

== Treatment ==
=== Diet ===
In general, a diet low in copper-containing foods is recommended. High-copper foods avoided in Wilson's disease include mushrooms, nuts, chocolate, dried fruit, liver, sesame seeds, sesame oil, and shellfish.

After initial treatments have lowered copper levels, a doctor may advise that moderate amounts of these foods can be safely eaten during maintenance treatment. If tap water comes from a well or runs through copper pipes, it is recommended to have the copper levels checked.

=== Medication ===
Medical treatments are available for Wilson's disease. Some increase the removal of copper from the body, while others prevent the absorption of copper from the diet.

Generally, penicillamine is the first treatment used. This binds to copper (by chelation) and leads to excretion of copper in the urine. Hence, monitoring of the amount of copper in the urine can be done to ensure a sufficiently high dose is taken. About 20% experience a side effect or complication of penicillamine treatment, such as drug-induced lupus (causing joint pains and a skin rash) or myasthenia (a nerve condition leading to muscle weakness). In those who presented with neurological symptoms, almost half experience a paradoxical worsening in their symptoms. While this phenomenon is observed in other treatments for Wilson's, it is usually taken as an indication for discontinuing penicillamine and commencing second-line treatment. Those intolerant to penicillamine may instead be commenced on trientine hydrochloride, which also has chelating properties. Some recommend trientine as first-line treatment, but experience with penicillamine is more extensive. A further agent with known activity in Wilson's disease, under clinical investigation by Wilson Therapeutics, is tetrathiomolybdate. It is regarded as experimental, though some studies have shown a beneficial effect.

Once all results have returned to normal, zinc (usually in the form of a zinc acetate prescription called Galzin) may be used instead of chelators to maintain stable copper levels in the body. Zinc stimulates metallothionein, a protein in gut cells that binds copper and prevents its absorption and transport to the liver. Zinc therapy is continued unless symptoms recur or if the urinary excretion of copper increases.

In rare cases where none of the oral treatments is effective, especially with severe neurological disease, dimercaprol (British anti-Lewisite) is occasionally necessary. This treatment is injected intramuscularly (into a muscle) every few weeks and has unpleasant side effects such as pain.

People who are asymptomatic (for instance, those diagnosed through family screening or only as a result of abnormal test results) are generally treated, as the copper accumulation may cause long-term damage in the future. Whether these people are best treated with penicillamine or zinc acetate is unclear.

=== Physical and occupational therapies ===
Physiotherapy and occupational therapy are beneficial for patients with the neurological form of the disease. The copper-chelating treatment may take up to six months to start working, and these therapies can assist in coping with ataxia, dystonia, and tremors, as well as preventing the development of contractures that can result from dystonia.

=== Transplantation ===
Liver transplantation is an effective cure for Wilson's disease, but is used only in particular scenarios because of the risks and complications associated with the procedure. It is used mainly in people with fulminant liver failure who fail to respond to medical treatment or in those with advanced chronic liver disease. Liver transplantation is avoided in severe neuropsychiatric illnesses, in which its benefit has not been demonstrated.

== Prognosis ==
If left untreated, Wilson's disease tends to become progressively worse and is eventually fatal. Serious complications include liver cirrhosis, acute kidney failure, and psychosis. Liver cancer and cholangiocarcinoma may occur, but at a lower incidence than other chronic liver diseases, and the risk is greatly reduced with treatment. With early detection and treatment, most of those affected can live relatively normal lives and have a life expectancy close to that of the general population. Liver and neurological damage that occurs prior to treatment may improve, but is often permanent. Fertility is usually normal and pregnancy complications are not increased in those with Wilson's disease that is treated.

== Wilson Disease Association ==
The Wilson Disease Association (WDA) is a nonprofit volunteer organization which has been established to support the people who suffer from Wilson disease. The Association's main mission is to finance scientific researches on this disease and enlightening people about it. The Association was created in 1978 in Binghamton, New York with the purpose to help the Pei family with 2 children suffering from Wilson disease by a group of individuals. The first president of the WDA was John Chung, the founder of the Association. He was a friend of the Pei family.

== History ==
The disease bears the name of British physician Samuel Alexander Kinnier Wilson (1878–1937), a neurologist who described the condition, including the pathological changes in the brain and liver, in 1912. Wilson's work had been predated by, and drew on, reports from German neurologist Karl Westphal (in 1883), who termed it "pseudo-sclerosis"; by the British neurologist William Gowers (in 1888); by the Finnish neuropathologist Ernst Alexander Homén (in 1889–1892), who noted the hereditary nature of the disease; and by Adolph Strümpell (in 1898), who noted hepatic cirrhosis. Neuropathologist John Nathaniel Cumings made the link with copper accumulation in both the liver and the brain in 1948. The occurrence of hemolysis was noted in 1967.

In 1951, Cumings (in England), and New Zealand neurologist Derek Denny-Brown (working in the United States), simultaneously reported the first effective treatment, using the metal chelator British anti-Lewisite. This treatment had to be injected, but was one of the first therapies available in the field of neurology, a field that classically was able to observe and diagnose, but had few treatments to offer. The first oral chelation agent effective in Wilson's disease, penicillamine, was discovered in 1956 by British neurologist John Walshe. In 1982, Walshe also introduced trientine, and was the first to develop tetra-thiomolybdate for clinical use. Zinc acetate therapy initially made its appearance in the Netherlands, where physicians Schouwink and Hoogenraad used it in 1961 and in the 1970s, respectively, and was further developed later by Brewer and colleagues at the University of Michigan.

The genetic basis of Wilson's disease, and its link to ATP7B mutations, was elucidated by several research groups in the 1980s and 1990s.

== In other animals ==
Hereditary copper accumulation has been described in Bedlington Terriers, where it generally only affects the liver. In Bedlington Terriers it is due to mutations in the COMMD1 (or MURR1) gene. The discovery of these mutations in the dogs led researchers to examine the corresponding human genes, but COMMD1 mutations could not be detected in humans with non-Wilsonian copper accumulation states (such as Indian childhood cirrhosis).

== See also ==
- Copper in health
- "Remorse" (2010) - Season 6, Episode 12 of the television series House, featuring a woman suffering from Wilson's Disease
