= Tiomolibdic acid =

Chemical compound

Clinical data
- Trade names: Decuprate
- Other names: Tetrathiomolybdic acid; choline salt: ATN-224, WTX101, ALXN1840
- ATC code: A16AX22 (WHO)

Identifiers
- CAS Number: 13818-85-4; anion: 16330-92-0
- PubChem CID: 4660425
- DrugBank: anion: DB05088
- ChemSpider: 21494208; anion: 10619308
- UNII: 206J6X63BE; anion: 91U3TGV99T
- KEGG: D12485
- CompTox Dashboard (EPA): DTXSID60160518

Chemical and physical data
- Formula: H_{2}MoS_{4}
- Molar mass: 226.21 g·mol^{−1}
- 3D model (JSmol): Interactive image
- SMILES: S=[Mo](=S)(S)S
- InChI: InChI=1S/Mo.2H2S.2S/h;2*1H2;;/q+2;;;;/p-2; Key:IEGNLZVDENYZEJ-UHFFFAOYSA-L

Tiomolibdic acid, sold under the brand name Decuprate, is a chelating agent under investigation for the treatment of cancer and of Wilson's disease, a rare and potentially fatal disease in which the body cannot regulate copper. It is developed by Wilson Therapeutics and used in form of the salt bis-choline tetrathiomolybdate.

Wilson's disease is a genetic disorder that is manifested by serious hepatic, neurologic or psychiatric symptoms. The disease is fatal if left untreated. It is estimated that 1 individual in every 30,000 to 100,000 worldwide has Wilson's disease.

Bis-choline tetrathiomolybdate has been evaluated in clinical trials in patients with various forms of cancer and has received orphan designation in the US and EU as a potential therapy against Wilson's disease.

== Pharmacology ==
=== Mechanism of action ===
Tiomolibdic acid selectively forms highly stable complexes with copper and proteins. These complexes are then believed to be primarily excreted via the bile, restoring the normal excretion route of copper that is impaired in patients with Wilson's disease.

The binding and excretion mechanism is stable; whereas many de-coppering agents form unstable complexes that are excreted via urine.

Bis-choline tetrathiomolybdate

== Clinical trials ==
As of November 2014, a Phase 2, multi-centre, open-label study was recruiting newly diagnosed Wilson's disease patients 18 and older to evaluate the efficacy and safety of bis-choline tetrathiomolybdate administration over a 24-week period.

As of 2016, tetrathiomolybdate had been tested in over 500 patients for up to seven years, primarily in oncology and Wilson's disease, as well as some other clinical pathologies.

The data suggest that bis-choline tetrathiomolybdate can rapidly lower and control toxic free copper levels and improve clinical symptoms in Wilson's disease patients. The data also suggest that it is generally well tolerated, with the potential for a reduced risk of neurological worsening after initiation of therapy compared to existing therapies.

== Dosing ==
Previous clinical studies with bis-choline tetrathiomolybdate in oncology patients have shown that it can lower and maintain copper levels using a once or twice daily oral dosing. This may be helpful since untreated Wilson's disease may lead to death within several years of the onset of symptoms, and medication use should continue throughout the patient's lifespan. Patient compliance is crucial for clinical improvement, and it is a particular challenge for Wilson's disease patients taking de-coppering treatments.

== Society and culture ==
=== Names ===
Tiomolibdic acid is the recommended International nonproprietary name (INN).
