= Lysyl oxidase =

Mammalian protein found in Homo sapiens

LOX
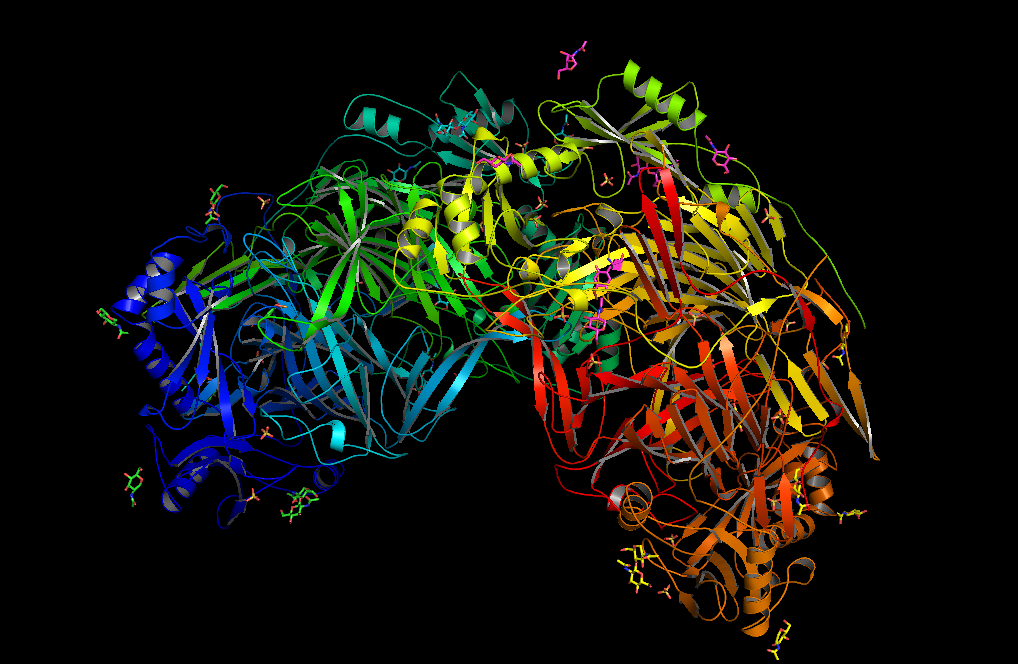

Identifiers
- Aliases: LOX, entrez:4015, lysyl oxidase, AAT10, Lysyl oxidase
- External IDs: OMIM: 153455; MGI: 96817; GeneCards: LOX
Enzyme activity
EC #	BRENDA	ExPASy	KEGG	MetaCyc
1.4.3.13	↗	↗	↗	↗

Gene location (Human)
Chr.	Chromosome 5 (human)
Band	5q23.1	Start	122,063,195 bp
Band	5q23.1	End	122,078,413 bp

Gene location (Mouse)
Chr.	Chromosome 18 (mouse)
Band	18 D1|18 28.22 cM	Start	52,649,139 bp
Band	18 D1|18 28.22 cM	End	52,662,939 bp
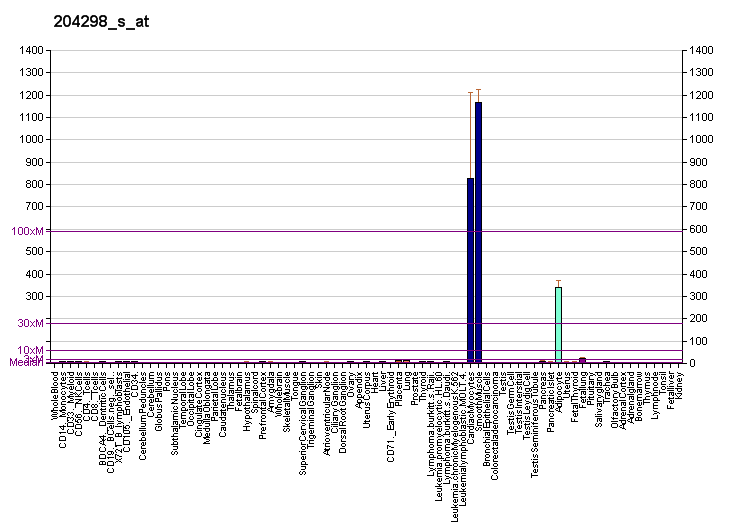

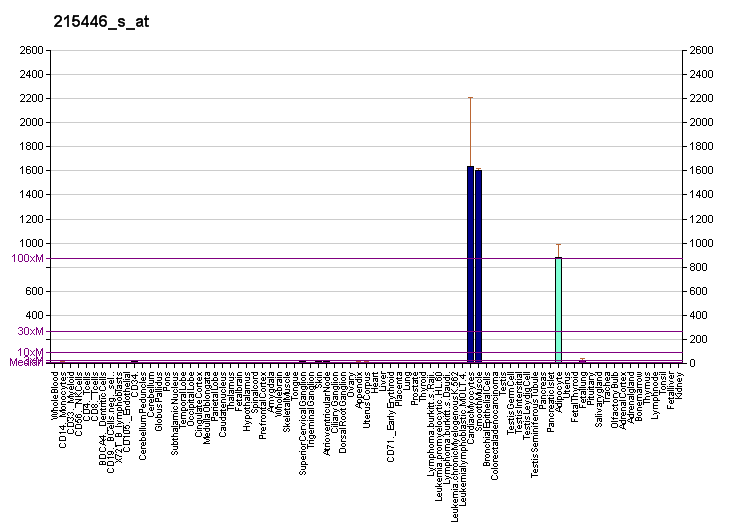

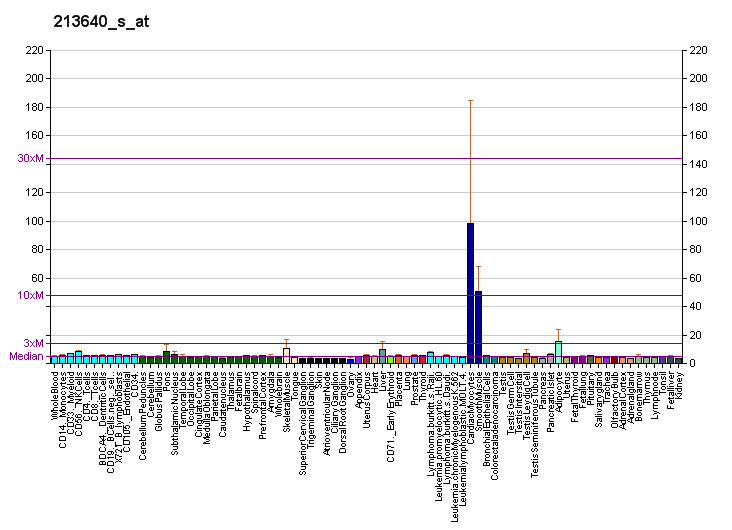
RNA expression pattern
Bgee	Human / Mouse (ortholog); Top expressed in: stromal cell of endometrium; Achilles tendon; tibia; skin of hip; periodontal fiber; cartilage tissue; pericardium; ventricular zone; skin of arm; skin of thigh / Top expressed in: stroma of bone marrow; umbilical cord; calvaria; body of femur; left lung lobe; molar; efferent ductule; dermis; ankle; ascending aorta; More reference expression data
BioGPS	More reference expression data
Gene ontology
Molecular function	oxidoreductase activity, acting on the CH-NH2 group of donors, oxygen as acceptor; metal ion binding; protein binding; oxidoreductase activity; copper ion binding; protein-lysine 6-oxidase activity
Cellular component	collagen; nucleus; extracellular region; extracellular space; extracellular matrix
Biological process	collagen fibril organization; lung development; response to steroid hormone; wound healing; aorta development; development of the heart; blood vessel development; response to hormone; elastic fiber assembly; blood vessel morphogenesis; peptidyl-lysine oxidation; osteoblast differentiation; regulation of protein phosphorylation; regulation of gene expression; regulation of striated muscle tissue development; regulation of transforming growth factor beta receptor signaling pathway; extracellular matrix organization; bone mineralization; platelet-derived growth factor receptor-beta signaling pathway; ascending aorta development; descending aorta development; regulation of apoptotic process; protein kinase B signaling; regulation of megakaryocyte differentiation; muscle cell cellular homeostasis; cell chemotaxis; connective tissue development; cellular response to organic substance; DNA biosynthetic process; regulation of receptor binding; regulation of bone development; cellular response to chemokine; regulation of platelet-derived growth factor receptor-beta signaling pathway
Sources:Amigo / QuickGO
Orthologs
Databases	NCBI: entry; OMA: entry
Species	Human	Mouse
Entrez	4015	16948
Ensembl	ENSG00000113083	ENSMUSG00000024529
UniProt	P28300	P28301
RefSeq (mRNA)	NM_002317; NM_001178102; NM_001317073	NM_010728; NM_001286181; NM_001286182
RefSeq (protein)	NP_001171573; NP_001304002; NP_002308	NP_001273110; NP_001273111; NP_034858
Location (UCSC)	Chr 5: 122.06 – 122.08 Mb	Chr 18: 52.65 – 52.66 Mb
PubMed search
- Wikidata
View/Edit Human	View/Edit Mouse

Lysyl oxidase (LOX), also known as protein-lysine 6-oxidase, is an enzyme that, in humans, is encoded by the LOX gene. It catalyzes the conversion of lysine residues into its aldehyde derivative allysine. Allysine form cross-links in extracellular matrix proteins. Inhibition of lysyl oxidase can cause osteolathyrism, but, at the same time, its upregulation by tumor cells may promote metastasis of the existing tumor, causing it to become malignant and cancerous.

== Structure ==
In the yeast species Pichia pastoris, lysyl oxidase constitutes a homodimeric structure. Each monomer consists of an active site that includes a Cu(II) atom, coordinated by three histidine residues, as well as 2,4,5-trihydroxyphenylalanine quinone (TPQ), a crucial cofactor.

In humans, the LOX gene is located on chromosome 5 q23.3-31.2. The DNA sequence encodes a polypeptide of 417 amino acids, the first 21 residues of which constitute a signal peptide, with a weight of approximately 32 kDa. The carboxyterminus contains the active copper (II) ion, lysine, tyrosine, and cysteine residues that comprise the catalytically active site. The three-dimensional structure of human lysyl oxidase has not yet been resolved.

== Mechanism ==
Lysyl oxidase-catalyzed oxidation of a lysine residue to allysine residue.

Lysyl oxidase the terminal carbon of the side chain of lysyl residue side chain. The enzyme belongsthe category of quinone-containing copper amine oxidases. The reaction requires the cofactor lysyl tyrosylquinone (LTQ). The LTQ cofactor is unique among quinones because it contains an 1,2-benzoquinone substituent. Furthermore, it is neutral charge at physiological pH. The ε-amine is condenses with LTQ to give the Schiff base via reaction with LTQ. The rate-limiting removal of a ε-proton yields an imine. Subsequent hydrolysis of the imine leads to release of the allysine residue. Molecular oxygen and the copper ion are utilized to reoxidize the cofactor, producing hydrogen peroxide as a side product.

Mechanism of the oxidation of the side chain of lysine residues by the action of LTQ. The lysyl oxidase participates in the regeneration of the quinone.

== Biological function ==
Lysyl oxidase is an extracellular copper-dependent enzyme that catalyzes formation of aldehydes from lysine residues in collagen and elastin precursors. These aldehydes react with unmodified lysine residues, resulting in cross-linking collagen and elastin, which is essential for stabilization of collagen fibrils and for the integrity and elasticity of mature elastin.

Complex cross-links are formed in collagen (pyridinolines derived from three lysine residues) and in elastin (desmosines derived from four lysine residues) that differ in structure.

The importance of lysyl oxidase-derived cross-linking was established from animal studies in which lysyl oxidase was inhibited either by nutritional copper-deficiency or by supplementation of diets with β-aminopropionitrile (BAPN), an inhibitor of lysyl oxidase. This resulted in lathyrism, characterized by poor bone formation and strength, hyperextensible skin, weak ligaments, and increased occurrence of aortic aneurysms. These abnormalities correlated well with decreased cross-linking of collagen and elastin.

Developmentally, reduced lysyl oxidase activity have been implicated in Menkes disease and occipital horn syndrome, two X-linked recessive disorders characterized by a mutation in a gene coding for a protein involved in copper transport. Thus, not only is LOX crucial to cardiovascular development, it plays a major role in connective tissue development and may also be important in neurological function.

Lysyl oxidase has also proven crucial to the development of the respiratory system and the skin, as collagen and elastin represent 50-60% of the composition of the lung, and 75% of the skin. In Lox homozygous null models (Lox -/-), the activity of LOX was reduced by up to 80%, and the phenotype of the lungs resembles those of patients with emphysema and dilated distal airways.

Lysyl oxidase plays a crucial role in the commitment step of adipocyte, or fat cell, formation from pluripotent stem cells during development. Its absence may lead to defects in the transforming growth factor beta superfamily of proteins, which control cell growth and differentiation.

== Clinical significance ==
LOX expression is regulated by hypoxia-inducible factors (HIFs), and, hence, LOX expression is often upregulated in hypoxic breast and head and neck tumors. Patients with high LOX-expressing tumors have poor overall survival.

In fact, recent research has shown overexpression of LOX as crucial to promoting tumor growth and metastasis in several cancers, including breast cancer, non-small cell lung cancer, and colorectal cancer.

LOX expression was also detected in megakaryocytes, or bone marrow cells responsible for the production of platelets. Data derived from a mouse model of myelofibrosis implicated LOX in bone marrow fibrosis.

In a rodent model of breast cancer, a small-molecule or antibody inhibitors of LOX abolished metastasis. LOX secreted by hypoxic breast tumor cells crosslinks collagen in the basement membrane and is essential for CD11b+ myeloid cell recruitment. CD11b+ cells in turn adhere to crosslinked collagen and produce matrix metalloproteinase-2, which cleaves collagen, enhancing the invasion of metastasizing tumor cells. In contrast, LOX inhibition prevents CD11b+ cell recruitment and metastatic growth.

In cells lacking TGF-β receptors, a deficiency that is characteristic of lung cancer, lysyl oxidase is found in high concentrations. LOX immunostaining has revealed that high LOX expression is associated with high extent of carcinoma invasion in samples obtained from surgically removed lung adenocarcinomas. Additionally, LOX expression is an indicator of 5-year survival in patients, with a 71% chance of survival for patients with low LOX levels, compared to 43% for patients with high LOX levels. Thus, upregulation of lysyl oxidase is a predictor of poor prognosis in early-stage adenocarcinoma patients.

Lysyl oxidase has been newly implicated in tumor angiogenesis, or blood vessel formation, both in vivo and in vitro. Subcutaneous tumor-derived LOX was shown to increase vascular endothelial growth factor (VEGF) expression and secretion, which then promotes angiogenesis by phosphorylation of protein kinase B, or Akt, through platelet-derived growth factor receptor β (PDGFRB). High levels of LOX were associated with high blood vessel density in patient samples. Clinically relevant LOX inhibitors may help slow cancer progression by downregulating crucial growth factors that promote solid tumor progression.

Hence, inhibitors of the LOX enzyme may be useful in preventing angiogenesis, tumor progression, and metastasis as well as treating other fibrotic disease involving remodeling of the extracellular matrix, including neurodegenerative and cardiovascular diseases.

== See also ==
- LOXL1
- LOXL2
- LOXL3
- LOXL4
- Menkes disease
- Occipital horn syndrome
