= CP-GEP =

Melanoma Gene Expression Profile

CP-GEP is a non-invasive prediction model for cutaneous melanoma patients that combines clinicopathologic (CP) variables with gene expression profiling (GEP). CP-GEP is able to identify cutaneous melanoma patients at low-risk for nodal metastasis who may forgo the sentinel lymph node biopsy (SLNB) procedure. The CP-GEP model was developed by the Mayo Clinic and SkylineDx BV, and it has been clinically validated in multiple studies.

== Clinical relevance ==
The sentinel lymph node biopsy (SLNB) is the standard of care for detecting nodal metastases in cutaneous melanoma patients and has been the most informative prognostic factor to guide subsequent treatment. However, ~85% of patients undergoing this procedure have no evidence of nodal metastasis. These patients are exposed to the risk of surgical complications. Well-known complications of SLNB include seroma formation, infections, lymphedema and other comorbidities. Because the SLNB procedure is highly complex, involves multiple medical disciplines, and is difficult to standardize, the false-negative rate is relatively high at 15%. Likewise, SLNB results that show minimal tumor cell deposits are difficult to interpret and may falsely indicate high-risk disease. The use of CP-GEP is expected to reduce the number of negative, nontherapeutic SLNB, as it has been specifically developed to identify and deselect patients with a low risk of nodal metastasis (below 10%). Per current clinical guidelines (NCCN, 2022), patients with a risk of having nodal metastases below 10% may choose to forgo SLNB, whereas patients with a nodal metastases risk of greater than 10% are recommended to undergo SLNB surgery. A diagnostic tool (rule-out test) that deselects patients for SLNB is therefore likely to improve clinical care. Better patient selection for SLNB would increase the accuracy of the clinicopathological assessment and reduce the exposure to unnecessary SLNB surgeries, thereby optimizing the allocation of healthcare resources. Moreover, initial studies have shown that the CP-GEP model may help predict the likelihood of melanoma recurrence.

== Model development ==
The CP-GEP model classifies patients as low or high risk for nodal metastasis based on patient age at melanoma biopsy (clinical factor), Breslow thickness (pathological factor) - a well-established risk factor currently used in clinical practice for melanoma staging – and the expression of eight genes from the primary tumor. These eight genes are involved in biological processes like fibrinolysis, angiogenesis, and epithelial-mesenchymal transition. The specific genes included in this CP-GEP model are MLANA, PLAT, ITGB3, SERPINE2, LOXL4, IL8, TGFBR1, and GDF15.

== Technical specifications ==
The sample type used is Formalin-Fixed Paraffin-Embedded (FFPE) tissue from the diagnostic biopsy of the primary melanoma. This material is collected via a shaved/punched biopsy or full excision. A total of 50-micron sections (e.g., five sections of 10 micron, or 10 sections of 5 micron) is required for molecular analysis and no macrodissection is needed for further processing. Gene expression data is obtained via quantitative PCR. The CP-GEP model is a logistic regression model. A repeated nested cross-validation scheme (double loop cross validation) was used to determine the performance of CP-GEP

== Clinical practice and GEP testing ==
In current clinical care, most providers adhere to the NCCN guidelines when considering SLNB referral of newly diagnosed melanoma patients. Currently, these guidelines do not recommend the usage of GEP testing in routine clinical practice, and state that pathological staging procedures should not be replaced. However, they do acknowledge the important potential of GEP tools in clinical care, and emphasize that these tests should be more extensively evaluated in prospective studies with large contemporary datasets of unselected patients. Scientific consensus has been reached by Grossman and colleagues from the Melanoma Working Prevention Group [ref] regarding the use of GEP tools in clinical practice. These guidelines are regarded as a benchmark for the development of GEP-based risk-stratification tools in the melanoma field.
