= LOXL2 =

Protein-coding gene in the species Homo sapiens

Identifiers
- Aliases: LOXL2, LOR2, WS9-14, lysyl oxidase like 2, LOR
- External IDs: OMIM: 606663; MGI: 2137913; GeneCards: LOXL2
Enzyme activity
EC #	BRENDA	ExPASy	KEGG	MetaCyc
1.4.3.13	↗	↗	↗	↗

Gene location (Human)
Chr.	Chromosome 8 (human)
Band	8p21.3	Start	23,296,897 bp
Band	8p21.3	End	23,425,328 bp

Gene location (Mouse)
Chr.	Chromosome 14 (mouse)
Band	14|14 D2	Start	69,846,517 bp
Band	14|14 D2	End	69,933,283 bp
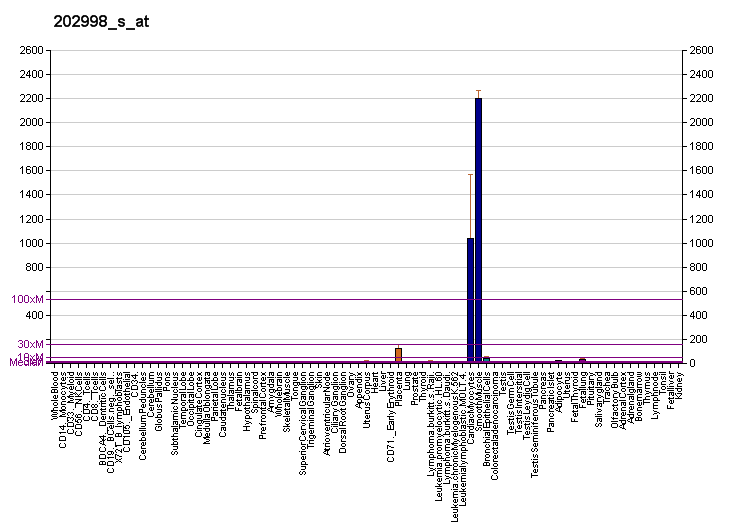

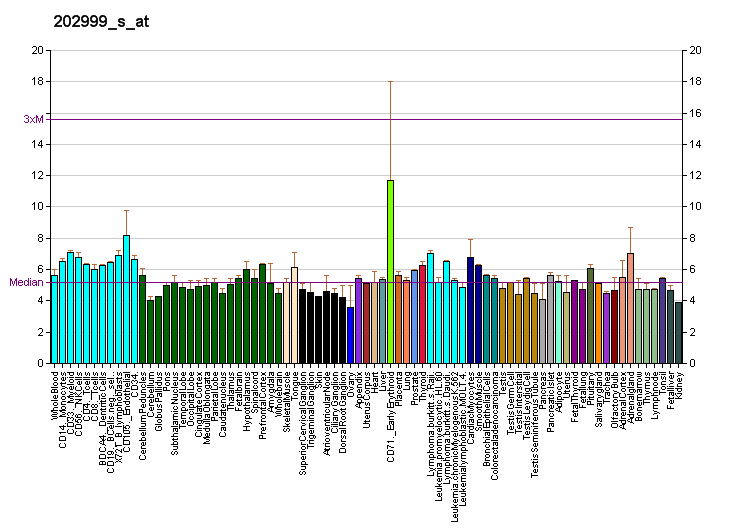

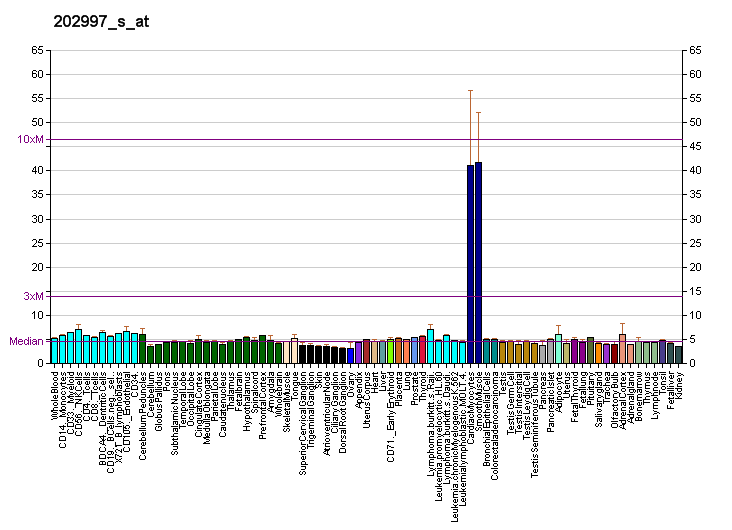
RNA expression pattern
Bgee	Human / Mouse (ortholog); Top expressed in: stromal cell of endometrium; cartilage tissue; tibia; gonad; adipose tissue; smooth muscle tissue; muscle layer of sigmoid colon; periodontal fiber; placenta; subcutaneous adipose tissue / Top expressed in: calvaria; body of femur; ankle joint; epithelium of lens; ankle; stroma of bone marrow; migratory enteric neural crest cell; external carotid artery; cumulus cell; dermis; More reference expression data
BioGPS	More reference expression data
Gene ontology
Molecular function	oxidoreductase activity, acting on the CH-NH2 group of donors, oxygen as acceptor; scavenger receptor activity; oligosaccharide binding; protein-lysine 6-oxidase activity; oxidoreductase activity; electron transfer activity; protein binding; copper ion binding; metal ion binding; calcium ion binding
Cellular component	nucleoplasm; membrane; chromosome; extracellular region; basement membrane; extracellular matrix; extracellular space; chromatin; nucleus; endoplasmic reticulum; collagen-containing extracellular matrix
Biological process	positive regulation of chondrocyte differentiation; response to hypoxia; collagen fibril organization; epithelial to mesenchymal transition; regulation of transcription, DNA-templated; endothelial cell migration; endothelial cell proliferation; receptor-mediated endocytosis; response to copper ion; cell adhesion; ageing; negative regulation of transcription, DNA-templated; sprouting angiogenesis; transcription, DNA-templated; electron transport chain; negative regulation of transcription by RNA polymerase II; positive regulation of epithelial to mesenchymal transition; peptidyl-lysine oxidation; heterochromatin organization; negative regulation of stem cell population maintenance; chromatin organization; vesicle-mediated transport; endocytosis
Sources:Amigo / QuickGO
Orthologs
Databases	NCBI: entry; OMA: entry
Species	Human	Mouse
Entrez	4017	94352
Ensembl	ENSG00000134013	ENSMUSG00000034205
UniProt	Q9Y4K0	P58022
RefSeq (mRNA)	NM_002318	NM_033325
RefSeq (protein)	NP_002309	NP_201582
Location (UCSC)	Chr 8: 23.3 – 23.43 Mb	Chr 14: 69.85 – 69.93 Mb
PubMed search
- Wikidata
View/Edit Human	View/Edit Mouse

Lysyl oxidase homolog 2 is an enzyme that in humans is encoded by the LOXL2 gene.

== Function ==
This gene encodes a member of the lysyl oxidase gene family. The prototypic member of the family is essential to the biogenesis of connective tissue, encoding an extracellular copper-dependent amine oxidase that catalyses the first step in the formation of crosslinks in collagens and elastin. A highly conserved amino acid sequence at the C-terminus end appears to be sufficient for amine oxidase activity, suggesting that each family member may retain this function. The N-terminus is poorly conserved and may impart additional roles in developmental regulation, senescence, tumor suppression, cell growth control, and chemotaxis to each member of the family.

LOXL2 can also crosslink collagen type IV and hence influence the sprouting of new blood vessels.

== Clinical significance ==
LOXL2 is an enzyme that is up-regulated in several types of cancer and is associated with a poorer prognosis. LOXL2 changes the structure of histones (proteins that are attached to DNA) and thus changes the shape of the cells, making it easier for the cancer cells to metastasize.

An antibody that inhibits the activity of LOXL2, simtuzumab, is currently in clinical trials for the treatment of several types of cancer and fibrotic diseases such as liver fibrosis.

== See also ==
- LOXL1
- LOXL3
- LOXL4
