= LOXL1 =

Protein-coding gene in the species Homo sapiens

Identifiers
- Aliases: LOXL1, LOL, LOXL, lysyl oxidase like 1
- External IDs: OMIM: 153456; MGI: 106096; HomoloGene: 4074; GeneCards: LOXL1; OMA:LOXL1 - orthologs

Gene location (Mouse)
Chr.	Chromosome 9 (mouse)
Band	9 B|9 31.65 cM	Start	58,195,021 bp
Band	9 B|9 31.65 cM	End	58,220,469 bp
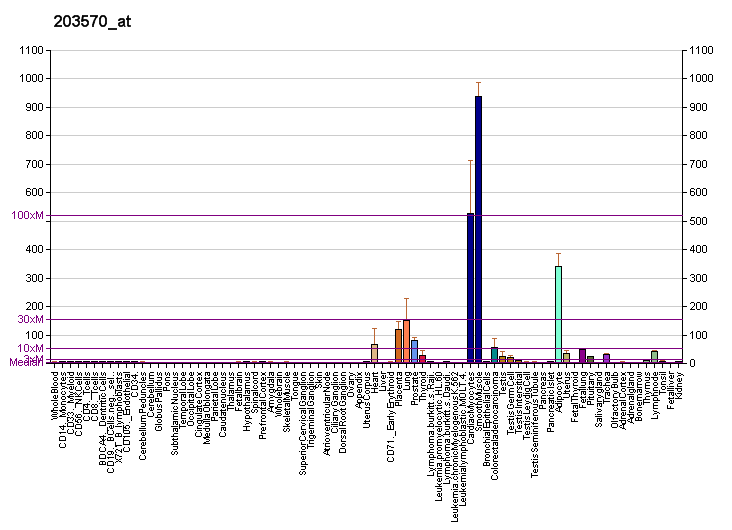
RNA expression pattern
Bgee	Human / Mouse (ortholog); Top expressed in: thoracic aorta; ascending aorta; stromal cell of endometrium; right coronary artery; urethra; left coronary artery; saphenous vein; retinal pigment epithelium; gallbladder; anterior pituitary / Top expressed in: ascending aorta; efferent ductule; epithelium of lens; aortic valve; calvaria; ankle; external carotid artery; tunica media of zone of aorta; stroma of bone marrow; vas deferens; More reference expression data
BioGPS	More reference expression data
Gene ontology
Molecular function	oxidoreductase activity; copper ion binding; oxidoreductase activity, acting on the CH-NH2 group of donors, oxygen as acceptor; metal ion binding; protein-lysine 6-oxidase activity
Cellular component	cytoplasm; extracellular matrix; extracellular region; basement membrane; acrosomal vesicle; extracellular space; collagen-containing extracellular matrix
Biological process	protein deamination; aorta development; response to lipopolysaccharide; extracellular matrix organization; peptidyl-lysine oxidation
Sources:Amigo / QuickGO
Orthologs
Species	Human	Mouse
Entrez	4016	16949
Ensembl	n/a	ENSMUSG00000032334
UniProt	Q08397	P97873
RefSeq (mRNA)	NM_005576	NM_010729
RefSeq (protein)	NP_005567	NP_034859
Location (UCSC)	n/a	Chr 9: 58.2 – 58.22 Mb
PubMed search
- Wikidata
View/Edit Human	View/Edit Mouse

Lysyl oxidase homolog 1, also known as LOXL1, is an enzyme which in humans is encoded by the LOXL1 gene.

== Function ==
This gene encodes a member of the lysyl oxidase gene family. The prototypic member of the family is essential to the biogenesis of connective tissue, encoding an extracellular copper-dependent amine oxidase that catalyses the first step in the formation of crosslinks in collagens and elastin. A highly conserved amino acid sequence at the C-terminus end appears to be sufficient for amine oxidase activity, suggesting that each family member may retain this function. The N-terminus is poorly conserved and may impart additional roles in developmental regulation, senescence, tumor suppression, cell growth control, and chemotaxis to each member of the family.

== Clinical significance ==
Polymorphisms of the LOXL1 gene are associated with pseudoexfoliation syndrome, a disease where the extracellular matrix contains abnormal amounts of cross-linked, amyloid-like fibrillar material and glycoproteins. When this happens in the eye, exfoliation glaucoma results.

== Interactions ==
LOXL1 has been shown to interact with FBLN5.

== See also ==
- LOXL2
- LOXL3
- LOXL4
