= Georgiana Dvorak-Theobald =

American ophthalmologist

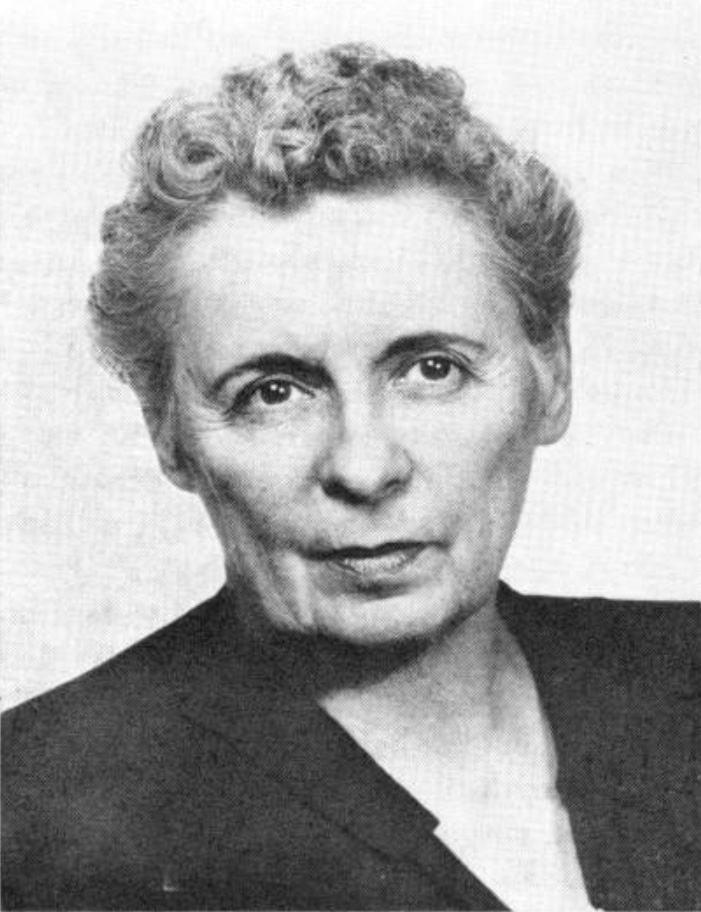
- Born: December 28, 1884; Chicago, Illinois, U.S.
- Died: January 6, 1971 (aged 86)
- Occupations: Ophthalmologist, medical researcher

Georgiana Dvorak-Theobald (December 28, 1884 – January 6, 1971) was an American ophthalmologist and medical researcher, based in Chicago.

== Early life and education ==
Dvorak was born in Chicago, the daughter of Anton Dvorak and Barbara Falout Dvorak. Her parents were immigrants from Bohemia. Her father was a tailor. She graduated from the College of Physicians and Surgeons in 1906.

== Career ==
Dvorak-Theobald was an ophthalmic pathologist at the Illinois Eye and Ear Infirmary from 1915. During World War I she worked with the American Red Cross in Europe and Siberia. In 1938 she was elected president of the Chicago Ophthalmological Society, and she was the first woman to serve on the board of directors of the American Board of Ophthalmology. She was elected vice president of the American Academy of Ophthalmology and Otolaryngology in 1953, and was a member of the American Ophthalmological Society.

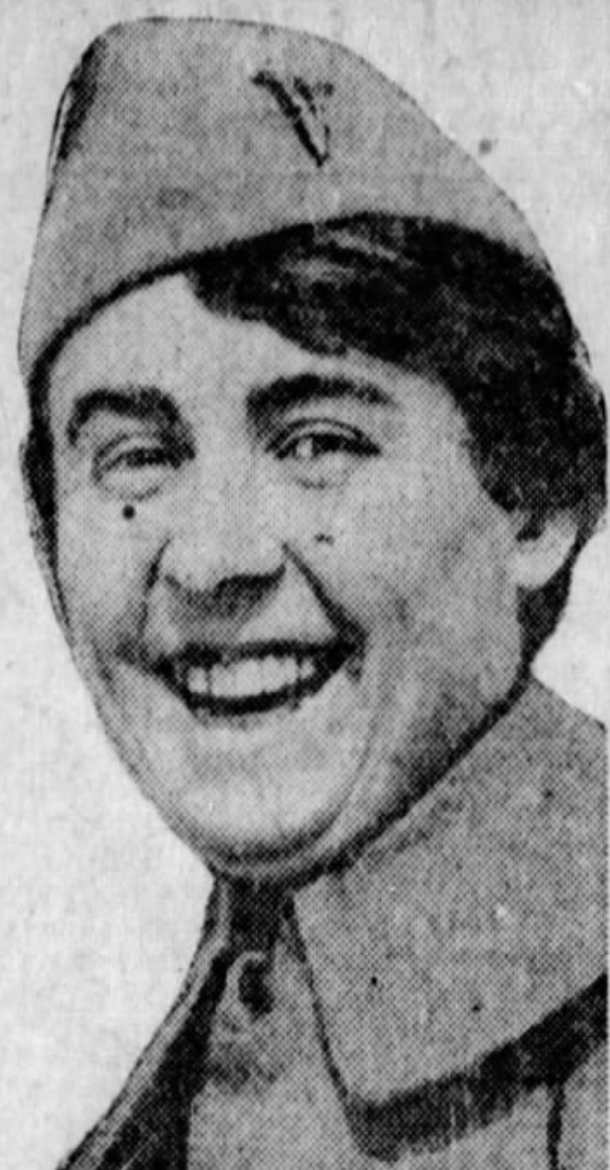
Georgiana Dvorak-Theobald, from a 1920 newspaper

Dvorak-Theobald retired from teaching at the University of Illinois' medical school in 1953. She was awarded the Howe Medal in 1957; she was the first woman to receive this award, one year before Ida Mann became the second. She gave the Francis I. Proctor Lecture in 1960. She was a charter member of the Zonta Club in Oak Park.

== Publications ==
- "The Frequency of Sympathetic Ophthalmia" (1930)
- "Oculoglandular Tularemia" (1932)
- "Schlemm's Canal: Its Anastomoses and Anatomic Relations" (1934)
- "Pathogenesis and Pathologic Anatomy of Chalazion" (1935)
- "Neurogenic Origin of Choroidal Sarcoma" (1937)
- "Radium in the Treatment of Chalazion" (1939, with Cleveland J. White)
- "The Histologic Study of an Eye from a Child Suffering with Arachnodactyly" (1940)
- "Histologic Eye Findings in Arachnodactyly" (1941)
- "Pseudoexfoliation of the Lens Capsule: Relation to True Exfoliation of the Lens Capsule as Reported in the Literature, and Role in the Production of Glaucoma Capsulocuticulare" (1953)
- "Further Studies on the Canal of Schlemm: Its Anastomoses and Anatomic Relations" (1955)
- "Aqueous Pathways in Some Cases of Glaucoma" (1955, with Harold Quentin Kirk)
- "Acute Tuberculous Endophthalmitis: Report of a case" (1958)
- "Cytomegalic Inclusion Disease: Report of a Case" (1959)

== Personal life and legacy ==
Dvorak married John Joseph Theobald in 1910. Her husband died in 1955. She died in 1971, at the age of 86. The Midwestern Ophthalmic Pathology Society was renamed the Theobald Society, in her memory.
