= John G. Lindberg =

Finnish doctor

John Gustaf Lindberg
- John G. Lindberg at the age of 35 years
- Born: 23 June 1884; St. Petersburg, Russia
- Died: 23 November 1973 (aged 89); Helsinki, Finland
- Education: Imperial Ophthalmic Hospital (St. Petersburg) (1915–1917); University of Freiburg (1920-1921, 1923); University of Helsinki (1917–1920)
- Known for: Exfoliation syndrome
- Spouse: Lilla Elisabeth Fazer (m. 1913; died 1973)
- Children: Wanda Elisabeth Lindberg; Roger Gustaf Lindberg; Konrad Gustaf Lindberg
- Scientific career
- Fields: Medicine, Ophthalmology
- Institutions: Imperial Ophthalmic Hospital (St. Petersburg) (1915–1917); Imperial Alexander University in Finland (Helsinki)(1917–1920); Private Eye Hospital of Dr. Strömborg (Vyborg) (1923–1929); University of Helsinki (1929–1934); Maria Municipal Hospital (Helsinki) (1935–1937); Kivelä Municipal Hospital (Helsinki) (1937–1951)
- Thesis: Kliniska undersökningar över depigmenteringen av pupillarranden och genomlysbarheten av iris vid fall av åldersstarr samt i normala ögon hos gamla personer (Clinical Investigations on Depigmentation of the Pupillary Border and the Translucency of the Iris in Cases of Senile Cataract and in Normal Eyes of Elderly Persons) (1917)
- Doctoral advisor: Ernst Friedrich Blessig

John Gustaf Lindberg (22 June 1884 – 23 November 1973) was a Finnish ophthalmologist who was the first to describe exfoliation syndrome, an age-related degenerative disease of the eye that often complicates glaucoma and cataract surgery, in his doctoral thesis that he wrote in St. Petersburg and defended in March 1917 in Helsinki, Finland, at that time a Grand Duchy in the Russian Empire.

== Early years ==
John Gustaf Lindberg was born to Gustaf Robert Lindberg (1844–1929), a Finnish engineer working in St. Petersburg, Russia, as a department manager in St. Petersburg Metalworks supervising the construction of boilers for steam engines and of metal bridges, and Anna Heloise Rautelin. Lindberg was the second of three boys in the family. St. Petersburg thus became his hometown, a fact that was to influence his career. The family moved to Helsinki, Grand Duchy of Finland in the early 1890s after his father had been offered a position as the Director of Technology in a recently founded company Kone ja Silta Oy (literally, Machine & Bridge, today Wärtsilä Corporation).

In 1903, at the age of 19, Lindberg matriculated from the Swedish speaking Real Lyceum in Helsinki. After preparatory studies for three years in botany, zoology, physics and chemistry in the Imperial Alexander University in Finland, he passed the medicophile examination, a mandatory step before applying to the Faculty of Medicine. He graduated in 1914 as Licentiate of Medicine. By that time, he had made up his mind to become an ophthalmologist after having frequently assisted during his university years in a private eye hospital in Helsinki, run by Johannes Silfvast (1867–1932).

== Specialization ==
Lindberg spent the rest of 1914 working as an intern at the Department of Surgery in Maria Municipal Hospital, Helsinki, and as a voluntary unpaid resident in the Helsinki University Eye Hospital. After mastering the basics, he enrolled in 1915 to the Imperial Ophthalmic Hospital in St. Petersburg. He also worked as a general practitioner.

All professors in the Imperial Ophthalmic Hospital before the Russian Revolution of 1917 were of German origin. During Lindberg's residency, the chair was Ernst Friedrich Blessig (1859–1940). The main research interests of Blessig were glaucoma and eye injuries. He proposed that Lindberg would explore the theory put forward two years earlier by Karl Theodor Paul Polykarpus Axenfeld (1867–1930) in Freiburg, Germany, according to which pigmentation of the iris would decrease and its transparency increase with the development of cataract. Lindberg started his research in 1915. Lindberg needed a slit lamp but this instrument was not yet commercially available. The theory behind a slit lamp had been presented by Nobel laureate Allvar Gullstrand (1862–1930) 4 years earlier. Lindberg consulted publications of Gullstrand, got hold of an old Zeiss microscope, and built his own slit lamp.

The material of the thesis consisted of 202 patients older than 55 years from the Imperial Ophthalmic Hospital, although some control patients were enrolled from the Kivelä Municipal Hospital and Oulunkylä Old People's Home, both in Helsinki, Finland. Lindberg made detailed drawings of the iris and lens as no photographic technique was yet available. While examining his patients, he found that many of them had small whitish flakes on the lens and the pupillary border of the iris. He grew interested in this unexpected observation. Eventually, such white flakes could be seen in one half of his glaucoma patients and they also were frequent in eyes with cataract. He noted an association with advancing age. Lindberg wrote his doctoral thesis in Swedish and entitled it (as translated to English) "Clinical Investigations on Depigmentation of the Pupillary Border and the Translucency of the Iris in Cases of Senile Cataract and in Normal Eyes of Elderly Persons". He defended it on May 30, 2017. Because the thesis was written in the Imperial Ophthalmic Hospital, his opponent was Väinö Grönholm (1868–1939) from the Imperial Alexander University in Finland where the thesis also was defended. The thesis fulfilled the academic requirements for the title of Doctor in Medical Sciences.

== Escape from Russian Revolution ==
The increasing tumult of World War I (1914–1917) brought the young family to Helsinki in 1917 after the February Revolution broke out following significant military setbacks for the Russian Army. On 6 December 1917, Finland separated from Russia and declared independence as a Republic. Lindberg first briefly practiced in the Eye Clinic of the Deaconess’ Hospital in Vyborg, Eastern Finland. He then took a voluntary appointment as Resident ophthalmologist in the University Eye Hospital in Helsinki and held this position until 1920. He already was a licensed specialist in Ophthalmology but considered the appointment useful to get a comprehensive training in every subspecialty of ophthalmology.

Although travelling abroad in the 1920s was expensive, slow and tedious, Lindberg visited in 1920 to the University of Freiburg, Germany, where he practiced science at its Department of Ophthalmology for one year and took part in clinical work under the guidance of Axenfeld. He returned later to Freiburg in 1923 to pursue studies in naphthalene cataract. He also became a regular participant in the annual meeting of the Deutsche Ophthalmologische Gesellschaft (German Ophthalmological Society) in Heidelberg. While in Germany, Lindberg met Alfred Vogt (1879–1943) from the University of Basel in Switzerland and gave him a copy of his thesis. In 1923, Vogt published about exfoliation syndrome without mentioning Lindberg. Vogt proposed that exfoliation was a consequence of prior surgery for glaucoma, but this was an error. After becoming Professor in Ophthalmology in the University of Zürich, Vogt undertook original research in exfoliation syndrome and became widely known in the United States, so that exfoliation syndrome was known there as Vogt's syndrome even decades later.

In 1921, Lindberg attended for the first time the Nordic Congress of Ophthalmology in Stockholm, Sweden, and met Birger Malling (1884–1989) from Tromsø, Norway, who also was briefed about the thesis. Malling also published about exfoliation syndrome in 1923 without mentioning Lindberg. He erred in concluding that exfoliation resulted from iridocyclitis.

== Later career ==
After returning to Finland in 1923, Lindberg moved his family for three years to Vyborg where he got an appointment as the Chief Physician of a private eye hospital. He was the only ophthalmologist in the Karelian Isthmus, and the first specialist in that hospital who had any research background. The inhabitants of Karelia were plagued by trachoma and eye injuries were common. No antibiotics or sulfonamides were available so that trachoma was mostly managed by everting the eyelids and rupturing the granules, as well as by topical silver nitrate and zinc sulfate, which was time-consuming. Lindberg kept detailed statistics.

In 1929, Lindberg got an appointment in the University of Helsinki as Clinical Instructor for four years, and he founded in the city a private practice that he ran for almost 40 years. He also worked as an ophthalmologist in the Central Military Hospital. The City of Helsinki maintained an eye casualty that was attached to the Department of Surgery at Maria Municipal Hospital. In 1935, Lindberg got an appointment as its Chief Physician. He was a frequent speaker in both domestic and international congresses. When the State of Finland in 1937 failed to fulfill a promise to develop a new building for the University Eye Hospital, the city founded an own Department of Ophthalmology in the Kivelä Municipal Hospital, and Lindberg became its Chief Physician, a position from which he retired in 1951.

Lindberg also functioned as the President of Finska Läkaresällskapet (the Swedish-speaking Medical Society in Finland), was two times the President of the Ophthalmological Society of Finland, and a member in several committees of the Finnish Medical Association.

== Influence on research in exfoliation syndrome ==
Knowledge of exfoliation syndrome remained very limited among ophthalmologists throughout the 1920s and 1930s. Archimede Busacca (1893–1971) became the first to study the histopathology of exfoliation syndrome in Italy in 1927. In 1937, Eivind Hørven (1896–1985), a Norwegian ophthalmologist from the University of Oslo, cited Lindberg's thesis in his paper in the British Journal of Ophthalmology and credited him as the discoverer of exfoliation syndrome. Lindberg's role was highlighted by Ahti Tarkkanen from University of Helsinki in the second thesis about exfoliation syndrome “Pseudoexfoliation of the Lens Capsule. A Clinical Study of 418 Patients with Special Reference to Glaucoma, Cataract, and Changes of the Vitreous” published in 1962. In 1989, Tarkkanen and Henrik Forsius from University of Oulu, Finland, published an English translation of Lindberg's thesis as a supplement to Acta Ophthalmologica, so as to make it widely available to researchers.

The 1st International Workshop on Exfoliation Syndrome was held in 1987 in Helsinki, Finland, followed by the 2nd in 1992 in Genoa, Italy, and the 3rd in 1995 in Erlangen, Germany. These were followed by informal Think Tanks organized in New York by Robert Ritch from 1999 onward. In 1998, an international society for investigators sharing an interest in exfoliation syndrome was founded. It adopted the name “The Lindberg Society”, and has since met regularly across the world.

== Personal life ==
On 1 April 1913 Lindberg married Lilla Elisabeth Fazer, daughter of the Consul General Konrad Georg Fazer and Jeanne Barrault. Lilla was to help John as his research assistant, copy typist and assisting nurse. Their first child Wanda Elisabeth was born in 1914, followed by Roger in 1915, and Konrad in 1918.
