= Simtuzumab =

Monoclonal antibody

Monoclonal antibody
- Type: Whole antibody
- Source: Humanized
- Target: LOXL2

Clinical data
- ATC code: none

Identifiers
- CAS Number: 1318075-13-6
- IUPHAR/BPS: 8412
- ChemSpider: none
- UNII: 11Z5AIU653

Chemical and physical data
- Formula: C_{6558}H_{10134}N_{1736}O_{2037}S_{50}
- Molar mass: 147492.33 g·mol^{−1}

Simtuzumab (INN; formerly GS 6624) is a humanized monoclonal antibody designed for the treatment of fibrosis. It binds to LOXL2 and acts as an immunomodulator. In January 2016, Gilead Sciences terminated its Phase 2 clinical study in patients with idiopathic pulmonary fibrosis (IPF) due to lack of efficacy.
