= LOXL4 =

Protein-coding gene in the species Homo sapiens

Identifiers
- Aliases: LOXL4, LOXC, lysyl oxidase like 4
- External IDs: OMIM: 607318; MGI: 1914823; GeneCards: LOXL4
Enzyme activity
EC #	BRENDA	ExPASy	KEGG	MetaCyc
1.4.3.13	↗	↗	↗	↗

Gene location (Human)
Chr.	Chromosome 10 (human)
Band	10q24.2	Start	98,247,690 bp
Band	10q24.2	End	98,268,194 bp

Gene location (Mouse)
Chr.	Chromosome 19 (mouse)
Band	19|19 C3	Start	42,582,421 bp
Band	19|19 C3	End	42,601,252 bp
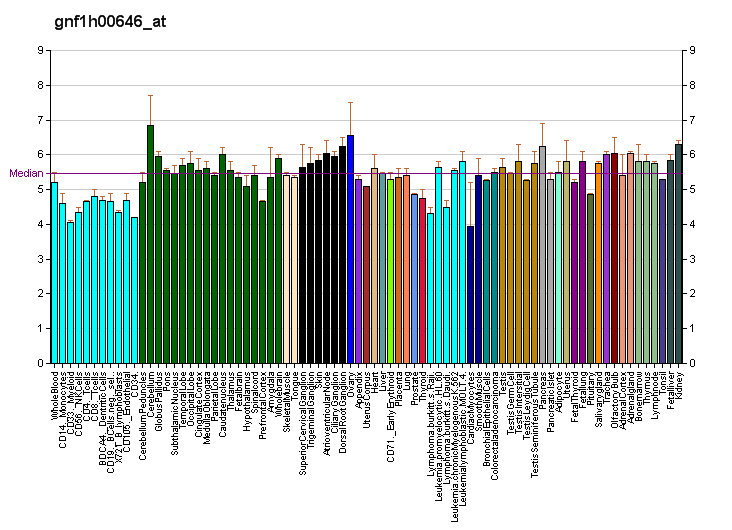
RNA expression pattern
Bgee	Human / Mouse (ortholog); Top expressed in: tibia; islet of Langerhans; cartilage tissue; tibialis anterior muscle; pancreatic epithelial cell; tendon of biceps brachii; pancreatic ductal cell; olfactory zone of nasal mucosa; nasal epithelium; stromal cell of endometrium / Top expressed in: membranous bone; calvaria; Dermatocranium; maxilla; mandible; molar; rib; lumbar spinal ganglion; ascending aorta; skin of external ear; More reference expression data
BioGPS	More reference expression data
Gene ontology
Molecular function	scavenger receptor activity; oxidoreductase activity; copper ion binding; protein binding; oxidoreductase activity, acting on the CH-NH2 group of donors, oxygen as acceptor; metal ion binding; protein-lysine 6-oxidase activity
Cellular component	extracellular region; receptor complex; extracellular exosome; membrane; extracellular space
Biological process	receptor-mediated endocytosis; peptidyl-lysine oxidation; collagen fibril organization; vesicle-mediated transport; endocytosis
Sources:Amigo / QuickGO
Orthologs
Databases	NCBI: entry; OMA: entry
Species	Human	Mouse
Entrez	84171	67573
Ensembl	ENSG00000138131	ENSMUSG00000025185
UniProt	Q96JB6	Q924C6
RefSeq (mRNA)	NM_032211	NM_001164311; NM_053083
RefSeq (protein)	NP_115587	NP_001157783; NP_444313
Location (UCSC)	Chr 10: 98.25 – 98.27 Mb	Chr 19: 42.58 – 42.6 Mb
PubMed search
- Wikidata
View/Edit Human	View/Edit Mouse

Lysyl oxidase homolog 4 is an enzyme that in humans is encoded by the LOXL4 gene.

This gene encodes a member of the lysyl oxidase gene family. The prototypic member of the family is essential to the biogenesis of connective tissue, encoding an extracellular copper-dependent amine oxidase that catalyses the first step in the formation of crosslinks in collagens and elastin. A highly conserved amino acid sequence at the C-terminus end appears to be sufficient for amine oxidase activity, suggesting that each family member may retain this function. The N-terminus is poorly conserved and may impart additional roles in developmental regulation, senescence, tumor suppression, cell growth control, and chemotaxis to each member of the family.

== See also ==
- LOXL1
- LOXL2
- LOXL3
