= LOXL3 =

Protein-coding gene in the species Homo sapiens

Identifiers
- Aliases: LOXL3, LOXL, lysyl oxidase like 3, MYP28
- External IDs: OMIM: 607163; MGI: 1337004; GeneCards: LOXL3
Enzyme activity
EC #	BRENDA	ExPASy	KEGG	MetaCyc
1.4.3.13	↗	↗	↗	↗

Gene location (Human)
Chr.	Chromosome 2 (human)
Band	2p13.1	Start	74,532,258 bp
Band	2p13.1	End	74,555,690 bp

Gene location (Mouse)
Chr.	Chromosome 6 (mouse)
Band	6 C3|6 35.94 cM	Start	83,011,154 bp
Band	6 C3|6 35.94 cM	End	83,029,543 bp
RNA expression pattern
Bgee	Human / Mouse (ortholog); Top expressed in: tibia; cartilage tissue; tendon of biceps brachii; ventricular zone; monocyte; decidua; Descending thoracic aorta; ascending aorta; stromal cell of endometrium; gonad / Top expressed in: occiput; occipital bone; axial skeleton; chondrocranium; cartilage of bone; lateral part of occipital bone; human vertebral column; rib; metatarsal bones; lesser wing of sphenoid bone; More reference expression data
BioGPS	n/a
Gene ontology
Molecular function	scavenger receptor activity; oxidoreductase activity; copper ion binding; protein binding; oxidoreductase activity, acting on the CH-NH2 group of donors, oxygen as acceptor; metal ion binding; fibronectin binding; protein-lysine 6-oxidase activity
Cellular component	extracellular region; membrane; extracellular space; nucleus; cytoplasm
Biological process	negative regulation of transcription, DNA-templated; receptor-mediated endocytosis; epithelial to mesenchymal transition; inflammatory response; peptidyl-lysine oxidation; spinal cord development; lung development; roof of mouth development; somite development; fibronectin fibril organization; negative regulation of T-helper 17 cell lineage commitment; positive regulation of integrin-mediated signaling pathway; collagen fibril organization; vesicle-mediated transport; endocytosis
Sources:Amigo / QuickGO
Orthologs
Databases	NCBI: entry; OMA: entry
Species	Human	Mouse
Entrez	84695	16950
Ensembl	ENSG00000115318	ENSMUSG00000000693
UniProt	P58215	Q9Z175
RefSeq (mRNA)	NM_001289164; NM_001289165; NM_032603	NM_013586
RefSeq (protein)	NP_001276093; NP_001276094; NP_115992	NP_038614
Location (UCSC)	Chr 2: 74.53 – 74.56 Mb	Chr 6: 83.01 – 83.03 Mb
PubMed search
- Wikidata
View/Edit Human	View/Edit Mouse

Lysyl oxidase homolog 3 is an enzyme that in humans is encoded by the LOXL3 gene.

This gene encodes a member of the lysyl oxidase gene family. The prototypic member of the family is essential to the biogenesis of connective tissue, encoding an extracellular copper-dependent amine oxidase that catalyses the first step in the formation of crosslinks in collagens and elastin. A highly conserved amino acid sequence at the C-terminus end appears to be sufficient for amine oxidase activity, suggesting that each family member may retain this function. The N-terminus is poorly conserved and may impart additional roles in developmental regulation, senescence, tumor suppression, cell growth control, and chemotaxis to each member of the family. Alternatively spliced transcript variants of this gene have been reported but their full-length nature has not been determined.

== Clinical significance ==
An autosomal recessive mutation (missense variant) in the LOXL3 gene is one of the causes of Stickler syndrome, a disease where collagen is not crosslinked properly. Common features are high myopia and cleft palate due to arthropathy (joint pathology) and vitreoretinopathy (pathology of the eye).

== See also ==
- LOXL1
- LOXL2
- LOXL4
