= Harry Raymond Eastlack =

American medical patient (1933–1973)

Harry Raymond Eastlack, Jr.
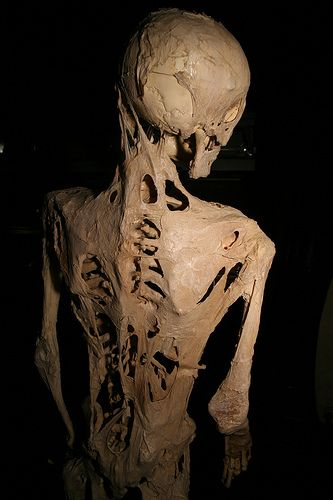
- Skeleton of Eastlack at the Mütter Museum in the College of Physicians of Philadelphia
- Born: November 17, 1933; Philadelphia, Pennsylvania, US
- Died: November 11, 1973 (aged 39); Philadelphia, Pennsylvania, US
- Resting place: The Mütter Museum
- Known for: Suffering from and supporting the study of Fibrodysplasia ossificans progressiva

Harry Raymond Eastlack, Jr. (17 November 1933 – 11 November 1973) was an American man who became the subject of the most recognized case of fibrodysplasia ossificans progressiva (FOP), a disease characterized by the ossification of fibrous connective tissue. His case is also particularly acknowledged by scientists and researchers for his contribution to medical advancement. After living with a rare, debilitating, and currently incurable genetic disease, Eastlack decided to have his skeleton and medical history donated to the Mütter Museum of the College of Physicians of Philadelphia in support of FOP research. His skeleton is one of the few FOP-presenting, fully articulated ones in existence, and it has proved valuable to the study of the disease.

As is characteristic of FOP patients, Eastlack did not demonstrate any possible sign of a disease at birth except for a malformation of the big toes. At the time, it was not recognized as the first clinical sign of FOP. It was not until 1937 that the first heterotopic ossification symptom surfaced. By the time of his death, Eastlack's skeleton bore sheets of bone along the vertebrae that fused to and locked his skull, and branches of bone along his limbs, which immobilized his shoulders, elbows, hips, and knees. He died in Philadelphia of bronchial pneumonia, aged 39.

== Early life ==
=== Birth ===
Harry Raymond Eastlack Jr. was born on 17 November 1933, at around 10:24 a.m. in the Woman's Hospital of Philadelphia as the youngest of two children of Harry Raymond Eastlack Sr. and his spouse, Helen Florence Eastlack (née Brown). There are no reports of any difficulties during delivery, though there was the observation of a minor congenital malformation. The noted malformation was a congenital bilateral hallux valgus, oftentimes referred to as a bunion.

== Family ==
Eastlack lived in Philadelphia, Pennsylvania with his sister and his parents. Eastlack was of Anglo-Scottish, Irish, and German descent, and his father was a World War I military veteran and a firefighter. Harry's elder sister Helene Davridge (née Eastlack) was born on 20 August 1932 in Philadelphia, Pennsylvania, and became a music teacher later as an adult. She died in September 1998, at the age of 66, in Sharon Hill, Pennsylvania, leaving behind her husband and daughter, Kristen.

=== Childhood ===
Records suggest that his childhood was an active and happy one. His pastimes consisted of listening to music on the radio or records at home. Eastlack would also enjoy reading, playing with his sister, and going to the movies. Additionally, a seat was exclusively reserved for him at the center of the seventh row in Hamilton Theater, a musical theater in Philadelphia. It has been claimed that ushers would not let anyone else sit there, as the spot was spacious enough to later allow Eastlack to stretch his immobile leg.

== Diagnosis ==
While heterotopic bone growth can begin spontaneously in FOP patients, Eastlack, like most patients, first experienced a triggered proliferation due to an illness or injury. When he was three or four years old, in 1937, while playing with his sister on a local street, a car hit him and injured his leg. He was taken to the hospital where his leg was put in a cast before returning home. The fracture never set properly, and when the cast was removed months later, his leg was painfully swollen with a high amount of inflammation. No further action was taken, and shortly after, Eastlack began to experience his first set of abnormal bone growths. His hips and knees had become difficult to move. When he was taken to the hospital with this concern, the doctor took X-rays in which the bony deposits on his thigh muscles were revealed. The doctors were not able to diagnose his condition having seen this, and it continued to progress in the anatomically characteristic manner that FOP does. Eastlack soon suffered flare-ups along his back, neck, and chest.

In attempts to diagnose and treat Eastlack's condition, the doctors ordered biopsies and performed a total of 11 surgical procedures to remove excess and heterotopic ossification, such as that on his thigh muscles. However, Eastlack's condition was aggravated by such procedures, and the bone plates returned thicker and more predominant. It was 1938, the year after the incident, when he was finally diagnosed with myositis ossificans progressiva, which is now known as fibrodysplasia ossificans progressiva (FOP).

== Later life and FOP progression ==
Unaware of the consequences of surgery on an FOP patient, the physician admitted Eastlack for hip surgery in 1941, which caused further physical restriction. Over time, Eastlack became more and more immobilized as more joints became fused and newly formed sheets or strings of bone calcified his limbs. In 1944, he was readmitted for a study which confirmed that the calcified smooth muscles, tendons, and ligaments had indeed become mature bone. The ossification along his vertebrae and other anatomical parts that Eastlack would suffer in the next 29 years ultimately fused him into a permanently bowed position.

Eastlack's case of FOP progressed at a more rapid rate due to the number of intrusive surgeries he underwent. In 1948, at the age of 15, his jaw had become fused, so he could no longer eat solid food and had to speak through clenched teeth. At a young age, he faced difficulty sitting down, as well. His hips were one of the first anatomical parts to become immobilized due to heterotopic ossification. Soon, bone formed across his upper arms and extended onto his sternum, tying his arms to his breast. Sheets of bone spread along his back and ribbons of bone extended from there to his skull, inhibiting proper head movement. The new bone growths throughout the years also caused juts of bone to form on his pelvis and thighs, and it caused both of his feet to become clubbed. One year, he accidentally bumped his buttocks into a radiator, and this resulted in a bruise wherein the smooth tissue was destroyed and gave way to newly formed bone. Ultimately, the only physical mobilites that Eastlack had left were that of his face (his eyebrows, eyes, ears, nose, cheeks, and lips), his tongue, and partially his teeth and jaw, although this was extremely restricted.

As the disease progressed and his bones ossified and he became more immobilized, Eastlack struggled more with routine movement and self-care. His family (especially his mother) would take care of him, but when she could no longer continue taking care of him as she grew older, Eastlack was then taken to a nursing home in Philadelphia, The Inglis House for the Incurables, which is now simply known as the Inglis House.

== Death ==
Eastlack died at the Inglis House for the Incurables—a care home dedicated to attending low-income, physically disabled individuals. As he approached the later stages of his life, he required assistance to stand and used a cane to be able to shuffle. During his time there, he broke his right leg, and the broken leg healed at an extremely odd angle. He spent the last years of his life being permanently disabled and bedridden and in severe and constant pain. He eventually developed bronchial pneumonia from the physical inactivity of his body. Due to the ossification of his ribs, his lungs could expand very little, and this made it almost impossible for him to even cough. Because he had extreme difficulty in being able to cough, even more bronchial fluid filled his lungs, eventually making it difficult for him to breathe. Near the time of his death, Eastlack told his elder sister, Helene, that he desired to donate his body and medical records to research, so that the disease may be further investigated and understood. On November 11, 1973, aged 39, Eastlack died of severe bronchial pneumonia.

== Medical contributions ==
Eastlack's home, Philadelphia, has become a center for FOP research with much of it concentrated at the University of Pennsylvania. With his skeleton on display, doctors and professors alike lead students to the Mütter Museum to observe the result of the rare disorder in-person. Since surgeries and examinations of FOP patients exacerbate the condition, the ability to study Eastlack's skeleton has been significant for research. For example, in 2006, the University of Pennsylvania's team of researchers and scientists led by Frederick Kaplan was able to distinguish the particular gene responsible for the disease, the ACVR1 gene. It is said that Eastlack's skeleton was a useful reference for this medical discovery. The International FOP Association is also granted Eastlack's skeleton for display and informational purposes in medical meetings and international FOP symposia, which physicians, researchers, and patients attend. For example, over 43 families were recorded to have attended a two-day symposium hosted in Philadelphia in October 1995 to listen to orthopedic surgeons and physicians discuss the details of FOP. During this symposium, Eastlack's skeleton was used as a reference. After seeing his skeleton at this event, fellow FOP patient Carol Orzel decided to also donate her body to the museum. She died in February 2018, and in February 2019, her skeleton was put on display next to his.

== Mentions in culture ==
In the 2009 film inspired by Edgar Allan Poe's "The Tell-Tale Heart", Tell-Tale, Eastlack is mentioned and referred to as Harry Erlich. The mention occurs in a scene where characters are in a museum, and a skeleton is referred to. The scene provides some genuine facts, such as how Eastlack's skeleton does not require any wiring or glue to be held together in the museum because the fused bones hold it all in one piece.

The short documentary Skeleton Boy features an interview with Frederick S. Kaplan about Eastlack's case.
