= FOP Friends =

British charitable organization

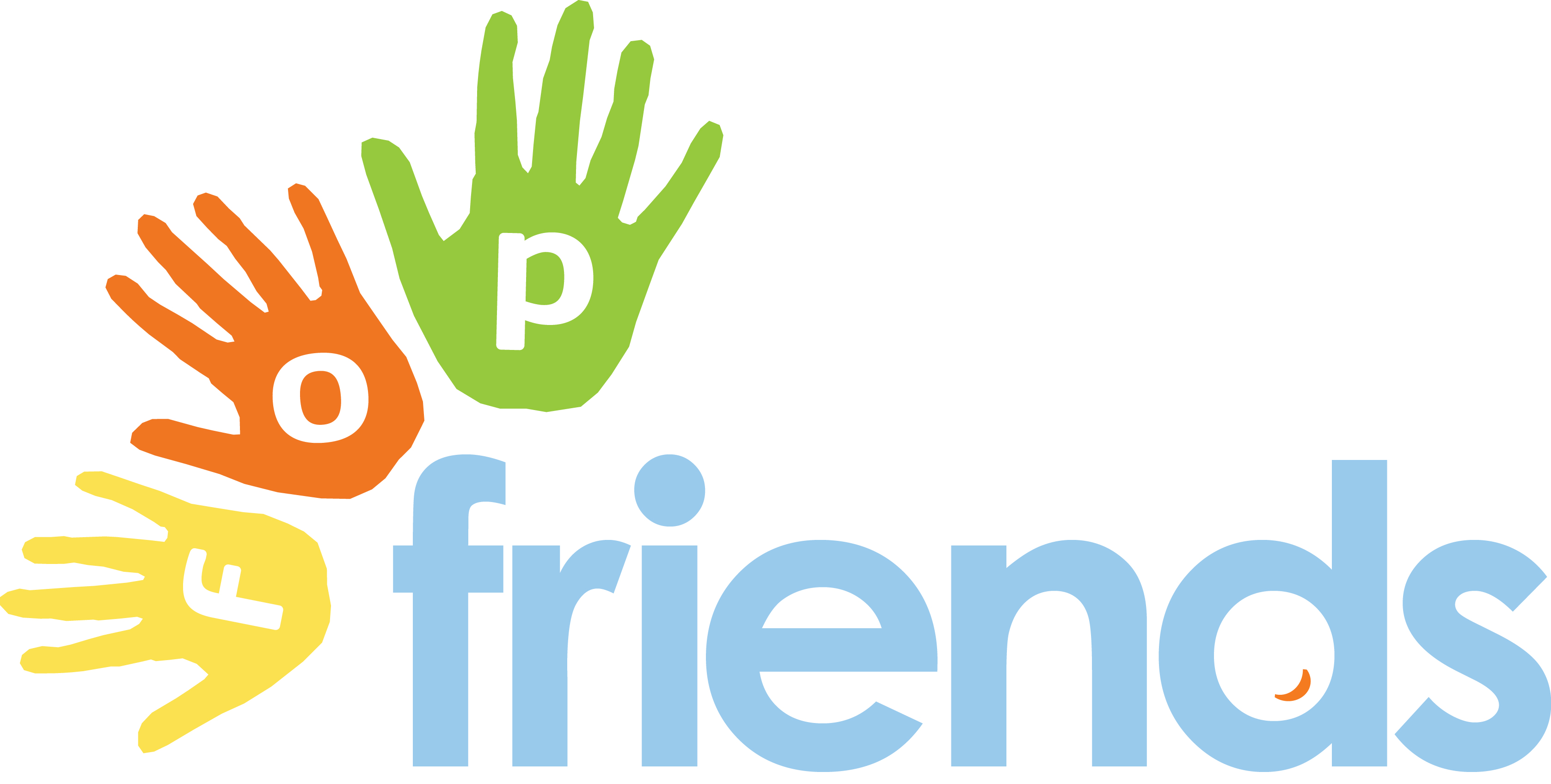
- Founded: 1 March 2012
- Type: Charitable organization
- Registration no.: England and Wales: 1147704 Scotland: SC046950
- Purpose: Promote research, education, support and awareness in order to discover treatments/a cure for FOP
- Location: Cumberland Road, Sale, Cheshire, M33 3FR
- Region served: United Kingdom
- Chairman: Chris Bedford-Gay
- Trustees: Alison Acosta Bedford (Founding), Rachel Almeida (Founding), Helen Bedford-Gay, John Leaver, Fiona White, Nicky Williams
- Website: www.fopfriends.com

FOP Friends, formerly Friends of Oliver, is a registered charity in the United Kingdom established on 1 March 2012. It aims to raise funds that are needed to find effective treatments for the rare genetic condition fibrodysplasia ossificans progressiva (FOP). The charity also works to raise awareness and understanding of FOP amongst medical communities and the general public.

== History ==
Friends of Oliver was founded when Chris and Helen Bedford-Gay received the diagnosis that their son Oliver had the rare genetic condition fibrodysplasia ossificans progressiva, or FOP. With FOP being such a rare disease, there was no UK charity dedicated to raising funds for research into effective treatments/a cure for the condition. Chris, along with his sisters-in-law Alison and Rachel, were the founding trustees of the charity. The original intention of Friends of Oliver was to keep family and friends updated with breakthrough news, to thank them for their continued support, and to celebrate Oliver's milestones. However, the charity grew significantly and an increased number of families affected by FOP began getting in touch. Friends of Oliver evolved into FOP Friends. This brought together the whole UK FOP community with the same goal: a cure for FOP.

In May 2014, FOP Friends held a UK FOP Conference and Family Gathering. An event like this had not taken place since 2000. The event gathered together families, from all over the UK, that were living with FOP. Presentations were given by doctors and researchers from the University of Oxford, England, and University of Pennsylvania, USA, as well as IFOPA and Clementia Pharmaceuticals. Frederick Kaplan, Robert Pignolo, and Eileen Shore from the University of Pennsylvania also ran clinical appointments for patients with FOP.

In May 2016, FOP Friends held their second UK FOP Conference and Family Gathering. This was funded by a successful grant from the Big Lottery Fund. Families, researchers and clinicians came together with over one hundred delegates present on the day. Presentations were given on the most recent research updates and Q&A workshops took place in the afternoon.

In 2017, FOP Friends partnered with Genetic Disorders UK. Genetic Disorders UK is a small registered charity that aims to support and improve the lives of individuals who live with a rare genetic disorder

In March 2018, FOP Friends were awarded a grant, for the third Biennial UK FOP Conference & Family Gathering, from Big Lottery Fund.

FOP Friends received a Genetics Disorders UK Jeans for Genes Day grant, to provide a residential weekend at Centre Parcs for 13 families in 2019.

== Use of funds ==
All the money raised by FOP Friends goes directly to supporting the research into finding a treatment and a cure for Fibrodysplasia Ossificans Progressiva.

=== University of Oxford ===
Researchers at the University of Oxford were instrumental in the discovery of the gene responsible for FOP in 2006. Professor Matthew Brown, a geneticist at Oxford, collaborated with Professor Jim Triffit, a member of the FOP team, to investigate the genetic linkage between families with inherited cases of FOP. This allowed the Oxford team to map the precise location of the FOP gene on the human chromosomes. The gene, a BMP receptor termed ACVR1, was mapped to chromosome 2 and more precisely to a small region between bands 23–24. The current University of Oxford FOP Research Team, established in 2009, is led by Professor Jim Triffit and Alex Bullock.

The research team at Oxford University is entirely funded with money raised from patients, family and friends. The team needs £120,000 per annum to fund the work of two post-doctoral scientists. Donations from FOP Friends accounts for around 70% of the total needed.

The FOP Friends charity has raised over £135,000 to support FOP research in the UK.

In 2017, IFOPA and FOP Friends funded new research at the University of Oxford. A research grant of $26,400 was pledged.

== 'Supporting a child with FOP : a Practical guide to their learning journey' ==
In May 2019, Helen Bedford-Gay published the book, 'Supporting a child with FOP: a Practical guide to their learning journey'. The guide informs educators, schools, and families about how to adapt school life for a child with FOP. The book demonstrates how to make sure a child with FOP has an engaging school life and how to ensure the child is included throughout their school career. The publication stresses the importance of social interaction for a child with FOP. The book covers advocating for the child, medical considerations, family support and practical tips. The text aims to provide information, support, and encouragement for children and practitioners alike to enable them to achieve their potential. The book was supported by a grant from Regeneron Pharmaceuticals.

== In the media ==
=== Television ===
On 23 December 2014, CBBC presenter Katie Thistleton appeared on Celebrity Mastermind and picked FOP Friends as her chosen charity.

BBC's Casualty consulted with FOP Friends on an episode with a FOP storyline that aired on 17 October 2015.

=== Literature ===
==== Non-fiction ====
FOP Friends' chairman, Chris Bedford-Gay is one of the co-authors of the medical article The Natural History of Flare-Ups in Fibrodysplasia Ossificans Progressiva (FOP): A Comprehensive Global Assessment.

==== Fiction ====
In January 2017, Chris Bedford-Gay and FOP Friends received a special acknowledgement in Fiona Cummins' debut novel 'Rattle'. Bedford-Gay consulted on the book as one of the main characters had FOP

=== Social media campaign ===
==== #FunFeet4FOP ====
#FunFeet4FOP is a social media campaign founded by FOP Friends that aims to raise awareness for FOP on International FOP Awareness Day. This day takes place on the 23 April every year and coincides with the discovery of ACVR1 gene that causes FOP. The aim of #FunFeet4FOP is to inform people that an important early indication of FOP is malformed big toes at birth. People around the world on the 23 April post photos of their feet to show their support and raise awareness of FOP.

== Awards and nominations ==
Year	Award	Category	Result	Reference
2017	Altrincham & Sale Chamber of Commerce Awards	Charity of the Year	Runner Up	
2018	10 Downing Street's Points of Light Award		Winner	
2019	Jeannie Peeper Award	Outstanding International Leadership Award	Winner	
2019	BBC Community Heroes Awards	Fundraiser - Nicky Williams	Finalist	
2022	British Empire Medal	Helen Bedford-Gay: For services to People Living with Fibrodysplasia Ossificans Progressiva and their Families	Winner	

== See also ==
- International Fibrodysplasia Ossificans Progressiva Association (IFOPA)
