= International FOP Association =

American organization

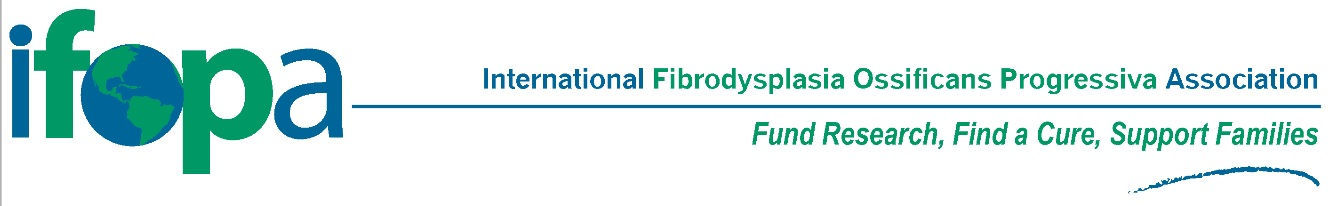
- Founded: 1988
- Founder: Jeannie L. Peeper
- Purpose: A cure for FOP, accessible worldwide
- Location: North Kansas City, Missouri, US
- Region served: Worldwide
- Method: To support and connect the global FOP community while driving research toward treatments and a cure.
- Key people: Jeannie L. Peeper, Founder and President Emeritus; Rebecca Wallace, Board Chairperson; Nadine Großmann, Vice-Chairperson; Sue Kahn, Secretary; Jamal Porter, Treasurer
- Employees: 9
- Website: www.ifopa.org

The International Fibrodysplasia Ossificans Progressiva Association (IFOPA) is a US-based 501(c)(3) non-profit organization supporting medical research, education and communication for those afflicted by the rare genetic condition fibrodysplasia ossificans progressiva (FOP). IFOPA's mission is to fund research to find a cure for FOP while supporting, connecting, and advocating for individuals with FOP and their families, and raising awareness worldwide. IFOPA is governed by a volunteer board of directors which may range in number from 9 to 15, at least one of whom must have FOP. The association's location is 1520 Clay St., Suite H2, North Kansas City, MO, 64116, part of the Kansas City, Missouri, metropolitan area.

== Founding and history ==
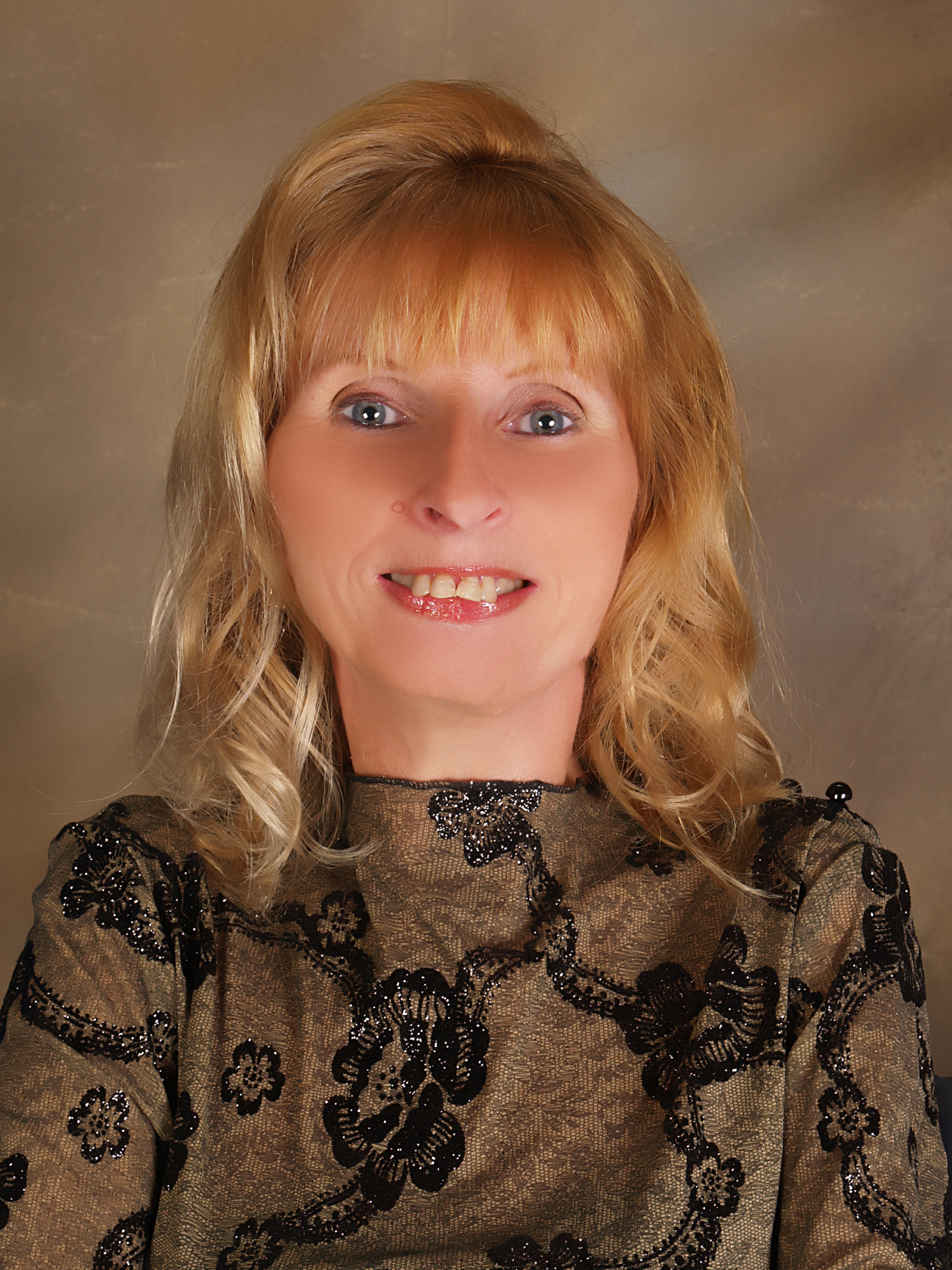
Jeannie L Peeper IFOPA Founder and President

IFOPA was founded in 1988 by Jeannie L. Peeper. Diagnosed with FOP in 1962 at age four, Peeper graduated from college in 1985 with a bachelor of arts degree in social work. Michael Zasloff, then at the National Institutes of Health (NIH), was studying FOP and put Peeper in contact with all FOP patients known to the NIH, eighteen in total, to whom Peeper mailed a questionnaire. Eleven responded. In early 1988, Peeper started a newsletter called FOP Connection in collaboration with Nancy Sando, one of the respondents. In June of that year, Peeper founded the IFOPA to facilitate fund raising for FOP research and generally create awareness of the disease. With an initial association membership of eleven, Peeper became the inaugural president and Sando was appointed vice president. In 1989, Peeper collaborated with the University of Pennsylvania to support establishment of the FOP Collaborative Research Project, and in 1992, the Center for Research in FOP and Related Disorders, efforts spearheaded by Drs. Frederick Kaplan, Michael Zasloff, and Eileen Shore.

Throughout the 1990s, IFOPA organized two international symposiums on FOP and several FOP family meetings. In the first decade of the 2000s, two more international symposiums were hosted by IFOPA, and other FOP scientific and family meetings were held in Argentina, Brazil, Canada, France, Germany, Italy, The Netherlands, Sweden, and the UK. In April 2006, the Center for Research in FOP discovered the FOP gene. By 2020, the organization had over 500 members from 57 countries and had partnered with FOP organizations and communities on all continents except Antarctica.

In 2010, IFOPA implemented the first annual Jeannie L Peeper Awards to recognize philanthropy, community involvement, international leadership and youth leadership in support of the FOP cause. Also in 2010, the Central Florida Chapter of the Association of Fund Raising Professionals named Peeper as winner of the 2010 Lifetime Achievement Award for her work in founding and establishing the IFOPA. A gathering of FOP families, supporters, researchers, and pharmaceutical industry representatives was held in Orlando in late 2013 on the 25th anniversary of the Association.

IFOPA hosted FOP drug development forums in 2014 and 2016 in Boston, 2017 in Sardinia Italy, and 2019 in Orlando. The forums brought together FOP experts to discuss the latest research, solve drug development challenges and strengthen the global network of research collaborations. The 2019 Drug Development Forum attracted 154 attendees from 19 countries including researchers, clinicians, biotech and pharmaceutical company representatives, regulators, advocates and people living with FOP.

Quoting the 27th Annual Report of the FOP Collaborative Research Project "As of January 1, 2018, there were 37 research universities and/or clinical centers actively engaged in FOP research; 18 in the United States & Canada, 12 in Europe, five in Asia, one in Africa and one in Australia. As of January 1, 2018, there were 12 pharmaceutical and biotechnology companies actively developing drugs for FOP based on a multitude of hard targets, and over 30 companies that have expressed interest."

In early 2017, IFOPA closed its Orlando office and the staff began working remotely.

== Use of funds and fund raising ==
Historically, IFOPA has allocated over 80% of its annual budget to medical research and programs, donating in the range of $350,000 to $650,000 annually to the FOP Laboratory. IFOPA is a GuideStar Gold Participant by virtue of the public information IFOPA provides beyond that available from the IRS.

IFOPA fund raising results principally from family-organized activities rather than large nationwide events. In addition to the association's own annual appeal, several grants, and traditional family/friends letter drives, the range of family fund raisers includes golf tournaments, barbecues, bingos, auctions, comedy shows, rock concerts, holiday card sales, raffles, suppers, athletic events, and a variety of other social events and receptions. Some of the more unusual fund raisers include an annual Burns Supper in Aberdeen Scotland, an ice fishing contest, and the auctioning of a quilt decorated with a double helical border symbolizing both the DNA double helix and the quest to find a cure. In 2010, the association established the Jeannie Peeper Heritage Society, a fund raising program that targets major donors and estate giving.

== Medical and scientific advisors ==
IFOPA's medical and scientific advisors are Frederick S. Kaplan, Eileen M. Shore, and Michael Zasloff. The foregoing advise the association on issues such as family support and counseling, dissemination of medical documents and treatment guidelines, medical document translation, physician awareness strategies, research funding requests and initiatives, and other matters for which their expertise is required.

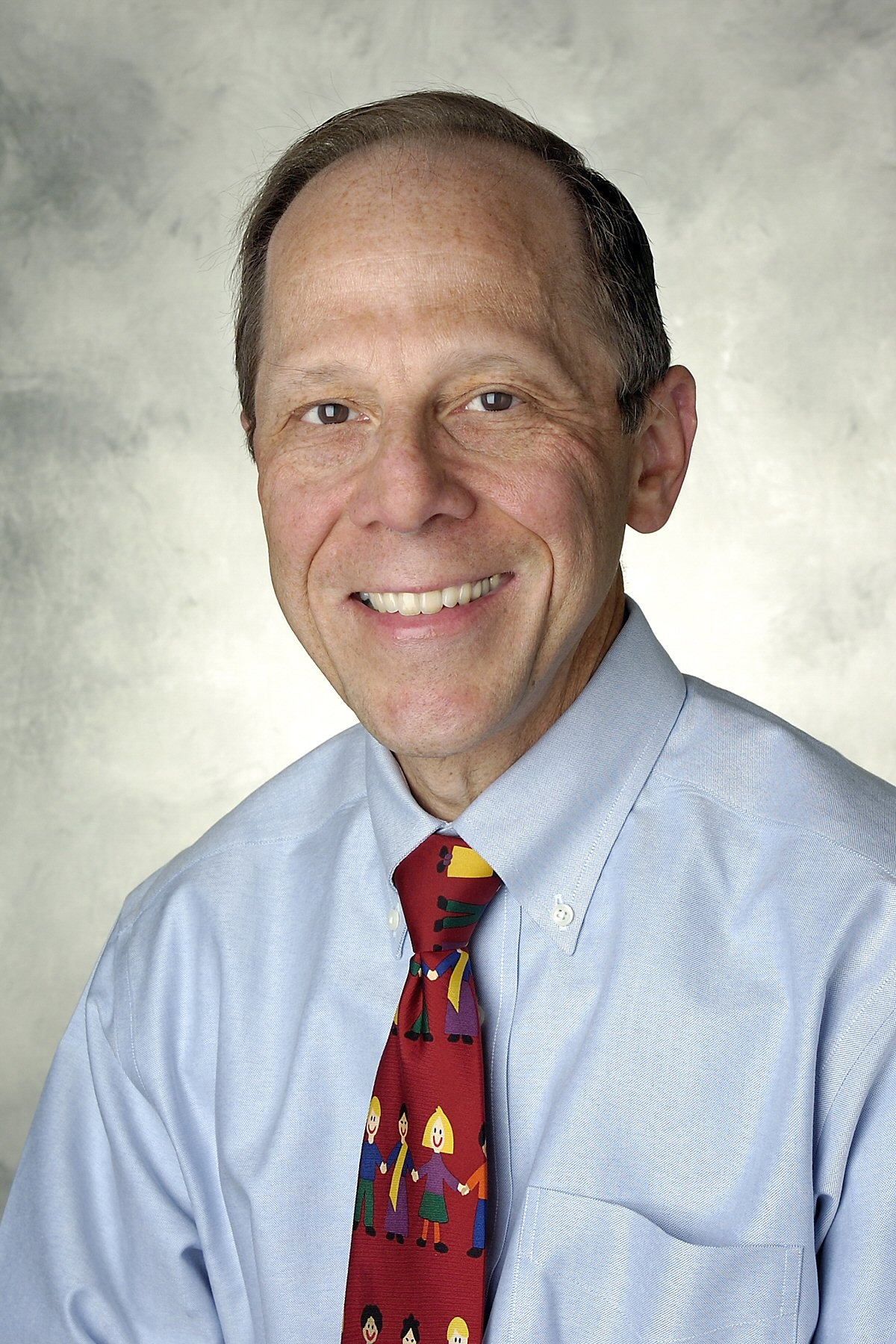
Frederick S Kaplan Co-Director Center for Research in FOP

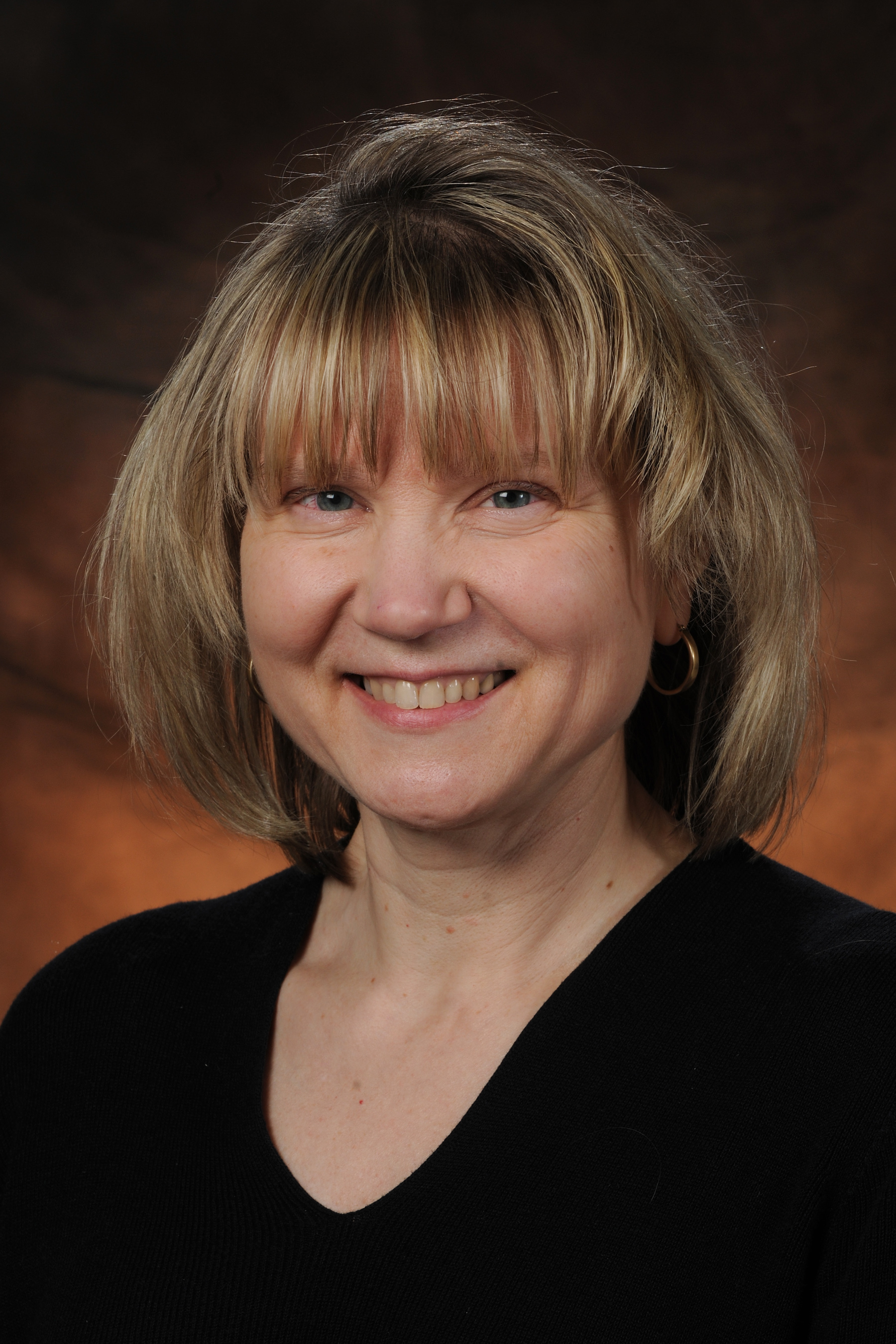
Eileen Shore Co-Director Center for Research in FOP

Kaplan is the Isaac and Rose Nassau Professor of Orthopaedic Molecular Medicine and Chief of the Division of Orthopaedic Molecular Medicine at the Perelman School of Medicine at the University of Pennsylvania. Kaplan co-directs the Center for Research in FOP and Related Disorders and is recognized as the world's leading expert on genetic disorders of heterotopic ossification and skeletal metamorphosis. In 1997, Kaplan was awarded the first endowed chair in the USA for orthopaedic molecular medicine. In 2006, Newsweek named Kaplan as one of "15 people who make America great". In 2009, Kaplan was elected to the Institute of Medicine, an organization established by the United States National Academy of Sciences to honor professional achievement in the health sciences.

Shore is the Cali and Weldon Research Professor in FOP, and Professor of Orthopaedic Surgery and Genetics in the Perelman School of Medicine at the University of Pennsylvania, Co-Director of the Center for Research in FOP and Related Disorders, and director of the FOP Molecular Biology Laboratory. She is a past-president of the Advances in Mineral Metabolism (AIMM) Board of Directors and served on the American Society of Bone and Mineral Research (ASBMR) Council. Shore was awarded a PhD from the University of Pennsylvania (Cell and Molecular Biology) followed by post-doctoral training in cell biology at the Fox Chase Cancer Center in Philadelphia. Shore's collaboration with Kaplan led to the discovery of the mutated genes in both FOP and progressive osseous heteroplasia (POH).

Zasloff is Scientific Director, MedStar Georgetown Transplant Institute, Georgetown University School of Medicine. In the early 1980s, during his tenure at the National Institutes of Health as Chief of the Human Genetics Branch, he began clinical and basic studies of FOP and helped found the IFOPA with Jeannie Peeper. In 1989, as the Upham Professor of Pediatrics and Genetics at the University of Pennsylvania and Chief of the Division of Human Genetics of the Children's Hospital of Philadelphia, he began his collaboration with Fred Kaplan to find both the cause and cure of FOP.

== Services and programs ==
As a result of the rareness of FOP, the condition is little known even among medical clinicians. Close to 90% of FOP patients worldwide are misdiagnosed. In such circumstances, the association directly supports research, makes information about FOP including symptoms and treatment guidelines available to both physicians and families, and supports afflicted families with mentoring, family meetings and an information network. Below are IFOPA's programs of research, education, family support, and advocacy. Additional information about these programs, including downloadable reports, articles and other materials, may be obtained from the IFOPA website.

=== Research ===
- The IFOPA provides pharmaceutical companies developing therapies for FOP with patient perspectives and input when needed and appropriate. Active clinical trials are posted at www.clinicaltrials.gov and can be found using the search term "fibrodysplasia." Also see the Drug Development tab on the IFOPA website.
- Funds the Center for Research in FOP and Related Disorders at the University of Pennsylvania School of Medicine with $350,000-$650,000 annually.
- In 2015, IFOPA initiated the Competitive Grant Program for research focused on new therapeutic approaches likely to have near-term clinical or translational relevance. One or several grants are awarded for a total of $100,000 annually, adjudication occurring by an independent Scientific Advisory Board. The program is funded by an anonymous family donor.
- Provides and supports the FOP Connection Registry, a global voluntary secure multi-lingual web-based database to collect and report demographics, disease and quality-of-life information from FOP patients. Enables health care professionals, clinical researchers, and drug developers to better understand the clinical characteristics and disease progression in the larger population of FOP patients.
- Administers scientific research studies on FOP members facing additional afflictions
- Organizes the donation of fallen baby teeth of FOP patients for the FOP Lab. The teeth are used to harvest tissue progenitors, thereby enabling research on FOP cell differentiation.

=== Education ===
- Provides education to the medical community about early symptoms of FOP.
- Develops, publicizes and distributes videos, brochures and information about FOP and issues relating to those diagnosed with FOP via the IFOPA website and YouTube.
- Provides FOP Facts in Brief: Contains brief facts on the following: What is FOP?; an example of the typical progression of FOP; demographics of FOP; clinical characteristics of FOP; finding a cure and treatment for FOP.

=== Family support ===
- An association website that provides the public with information about FOP, developments in medical research, links to relevant websites, and contact information.
- The Betty Ann Laue/IFOPA Resource Center: a central clearinghouse for information about FOP located at the IFOPA office in Florida.
- The Medical Management of Fibrodysplasia Ossificans Progressiva: Current Treatment Considerations (March 2019).
- What is FOP? A Guidebook for Families and What is FOP? Questions and Answers for the Children are resource packages written for families dealing with FOP.
- Medical Binder: each IFOPA member with FOP is provided with a binder that organizes and stores all information and medical documents needed by physicians in an emergency or for regular doctor appointments or hospital stays. The binder includes emergency contact numbers, current and past prescriptions, medical history, and medications and supplements.
- FOPonline: an online member forum for discussion, support and research news.
- LIFE Awards, "Living Independently with Full Equality" awards provide funding to enable independent living for those with FOP.
- FOP Connection is the IFOPA's electronic quarterly newsletter. It features pictures and articles about and by members, fund raising events, donor acknowledgment, research developments, and suggestions and resources for living with FOP.
- Mentoring Program provides a family-to-family connection with volunteer representatives in addition to staff support. Each volunteer is either personally afflicted with FOP or is the parent/sibling/caregiver of a person with FOP.
- Symposia and meetings involving FOP patients with health practitioners who specialize in FOP in a collaborative forum to discuss FOP research, exchange information, and share coping strategies.
- International President's Council: a world-wide network of volunteers who locate FOP families in their countries, establish local FOP organizations and share information regarding awareness activities, fund raising events and other FOP-related activities.
- Translation Project: a service delivered largely by international volunteers (typically International President's Council representatives) who provide IFOPA documents and other materials in major languages (including at least French, German, Portuguese, Spanish, and Swedish).
- Traveling Resource Center provides the global FOP community with information and instructions regarding tools and gadgets that help FOP patients to overcome their disabilities and live independently.
- E-Learning Events - provides and shares information among members about overcoming common obstacles and everyday situations through video seminars and other web-enhanced communication methods.
- PrayforFOPHealing is an online group that gives IFOPA members an opportunity to share prayer requests, inspirational quotes and poems and talk about how faith sustains them.

=== Advocacy ===
- IFOPA is a member of the Rare Bone Disease Alliance, National Organization for Rare Disorders (NORD), and The Haystack Project. The IFOPA also participates in activities sponsored by the EveryLife Foundation for Rare Diseases and Global Genes. Many of the FOP national organizations belong to rare disease organizations in their countries.
