= C27H30N2O2 =

The molecular formula C_{27}H_{30}N_{2}O_{2} may refer to:

- Asimadoline, experimental drug which acts as a peripherally selective κ-opioid receptor (KOR) agonist
- Palovarotene, a highly selective retinoic acid receptor gamma (RAR-γ) agonist
