= Carol Orzel =

American disability rights activist (1959–2018)

- Born: April 20, 1959; Philadelphia, Pennsylvania, United States
- Died: February, 2018 (aged 58); Philadelphia, Pennsylvania, United States
- Cause of death: Complications from FOP
- Known for: Disability activism, advocacy for the study of fibrodysplasia ossificans progressiva

Carol Orzel (April 20, 1959 – February 2018) was an American woman with fibrodysplasia ossificans progressiva (FOP). She advocated for research into FOP and was an activist for disability rights. Before her death, she requested that her skeleton be displayed in the Mütter Museum.

== Early life ==
Carol Orzel was born in Philadelphia, Pennsylvania, in 1959. She was diagnosed with FOP, a rare disease that causes tissue to ossify. In 1982 at age 23, she moved to Inglis House, a nursing-care facility, at its Belmont Avenue campus.

== Advocacy and association with University of Pennsylvania ==
After moving to Inglis House, Orzel became a patient of doctor Frederick Kaplan at the University of Pennsylvania. Kaplan had never before met someone with FOP, and the disease would become his focus. Orzel gave annual talks to incoming medical students at University of Pennsylvania to help them better understand treating people with disabilities. The Mütter Museum notes that she "advocated for more research, established networks of communication with others with FOP, and educated both the public and medical professionals about the disease." She was involved in the International FOP Association, or IFOPA, and cut the ribbon at the opening of UPenn's FOP Research Laboratory. It was this laboratory where the gene that causes FOP was discovered in 2006.

== Donation of skeleton to Mütter Museum ==
In 1995, Orzel saw the skeleton of Harry Eastlack, a famous patient of FOP, at an IFOPA conference. The skeleton was on loan from the Mütter Museum, and Orzel decided that after she died, she wanted her skeleton to be displayed with Eastlack's, on the condition that her jewelry was displayed too. When Orzel died at the Hospital of the University of Pennsylvania in 2018, Kaplan and executives from Inglis House contacted the Mütter Museum. Curator Anna Dhody oversaw the project. Due to FOP and osteoporosis, Orzel's body was very delicate and difficult to transport and prepare. Her body was transported from Philadelphia to Skulls Unlimited in Oklahoma City for processing. Orzel's skeleton and her jewelry went on display in the Mütter Museum in February 2019.
