= Eileen Shore =

American medical researcher

Eileen M. Shore
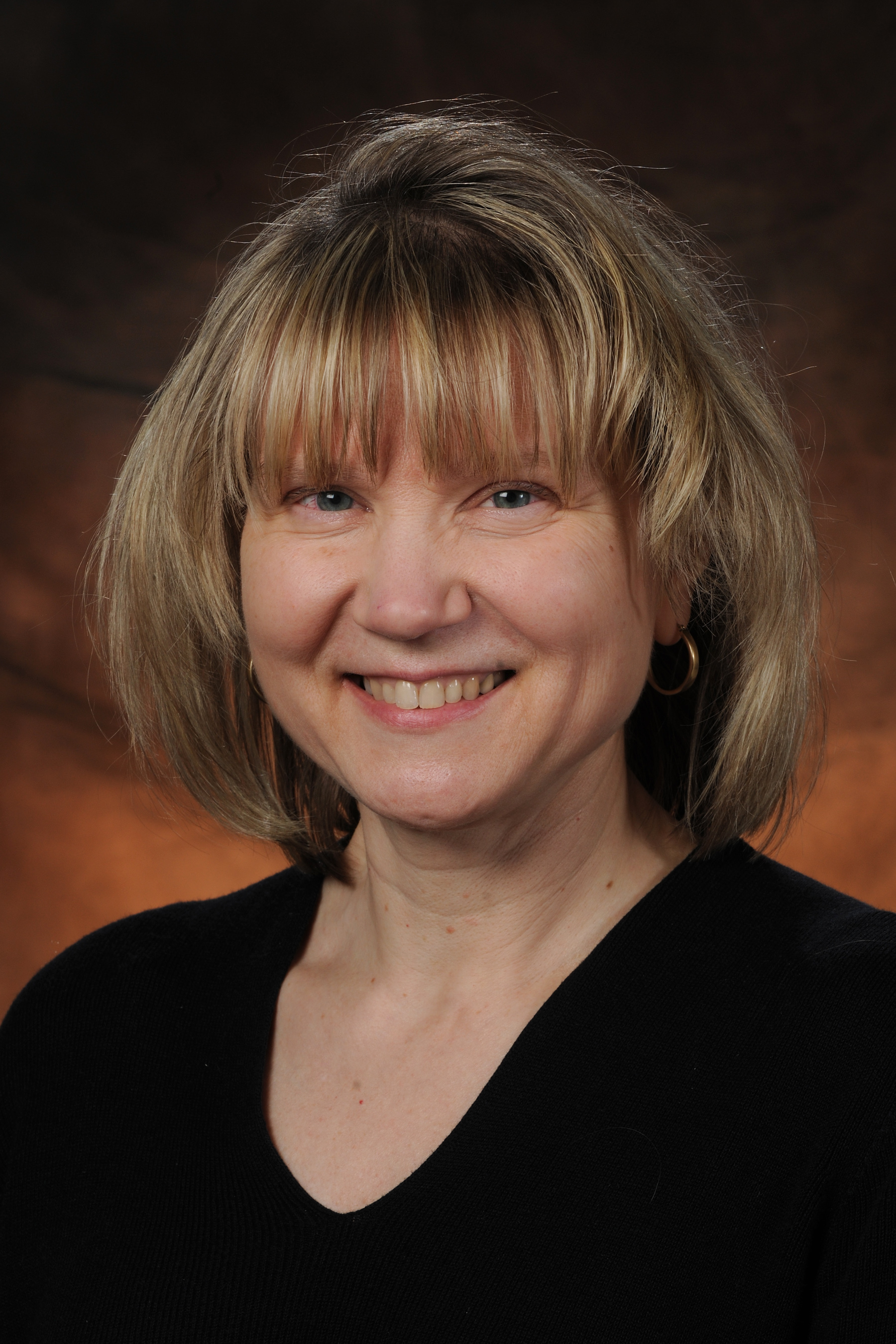
- Born: Newark, New Jersey
- Known for: Research on connective tissue diseases
- Scientific career
- Fields: Genetics

Eileen M. Shore is an American medical researcher and geneticist specializing in research of muscoskeletal disorders such as fibrodysplasia ossificans progressiva.

== Education ==
Shore received her bachelor's degree in biology from the University of Notre Dame in 1976. She then earned a Master of Arts in biology at Indiana University in 1978. Subsequently, she received her PhD from the University of Pennsylvania in cell and molecular biology in 1987.

== FOP research ==
Shore undertakes research into fibrodysplasia ossificans progressiva (FOP), a genetic disease that causes bone tissue to form outside the skeleton, known as heterotopic ossification. In 1992, Shore and Frederick Kaplan initiated the FOP Research Laboratory. Kaplan hired Shore because of her experience as a geneticist—she researched fruit fly larvae as a graduate student and studied mammalian embryology as a postdoctoral researcher.

In 2006, Shore and Kaplan published their findings on the genetic mutation that causes FOP as a paper entitled "A recurrent mutation in the BMP type I receptor ACVR1 causes inherited and sporadic fibrodysplasia ossificans progressiva". The cause of the disease was traced to a single mutation in the activin A receptor, type I gene.

Once the cause of the disease was identified, Shore became involved in efforts to control the disease and its symptoms. In 2016, she was coauthor on a paper that explored the efficacy of a drug on mice with the same genetic mutation. The authors concluded that the drug palovarotene showed promise in preventing heterotopic ossification, stating that there was "clear evidence for its encompassing therapeutic potential".

As of 2015, Kaplan and Shore were the directors of the Center for Research in FOP and Related Disorders. They are considered the "world's foremost experts on FOP".

== Awards and honors ==
Shore has been the recipient of several awards, including:

- Orthopaedic Research and Education Foundation's Johnson and Johnson Research Award (1994)
- Advances in Mineral Metabolism (AIMM) Young Investigator Award (2000)
- Johnson & Johnson Focused Giving Award (2002)
- Alpha Omega Alpha Honor Medical Society Visiting Professor (2008)

== Selected publications ==
- Shore, Eileen M.; Xu, Meiqi; Feldman, George J.; Fenstermacher, David A.; Cho, Tae-Joon; Choi, In Ho; Connor, J Michael; Delai, Patricia; Glaser, David L.; Lemerrer, Martine; Morhart, Rolf; Rogers, John G.; Smith, Roger; Triffitt, James T.; Urtizberea, J Andoni; Zasloff, Michael; Brown, Matthew A.; Kaplan, Frederick S. (2006). "A recurrent mutation in the BMP type I receptor ACVR1 causes inherited and sporadic fibrodysplasia ossificans progressiva". Nature Genetics. 38 (5): 525–527. doi:10.1038/ng1783. PMID 16642017. S2CID 41579747.
- Medici, Damian; Shore, Eileen M.; Lounev, Vitali Y.; Kaplan, Frederick S.; Kalluri, Raghu; Olsen, Bjorn R. (2010). "Conversion of vascular endothelial cells into multipotent stem-like cells". Nature Medicine. 16 (12): 1400–1406. doi:10.1038/nm.2252. PMC 3209716. PMID 21102460.
- Shafritz, Adam B.; Shore, Eileen M.; Gannon, Francis H.; Zasloff, Michael A.; Taub, Rebecca; Muenke, Maximilian; Kaplan, Frederick S. (1996). "Overexpression of an Osteogenic Morphogen in Fibrodysplasia Ossificans Progressiva". New England Journal of Medicine. 335 (8): 555–561. doi:10.1056/NEJM199608223350804. PMID 8678932.
