= Michael Zasloff =

American physician–scientist and immunologist

Michael A. Zasloff
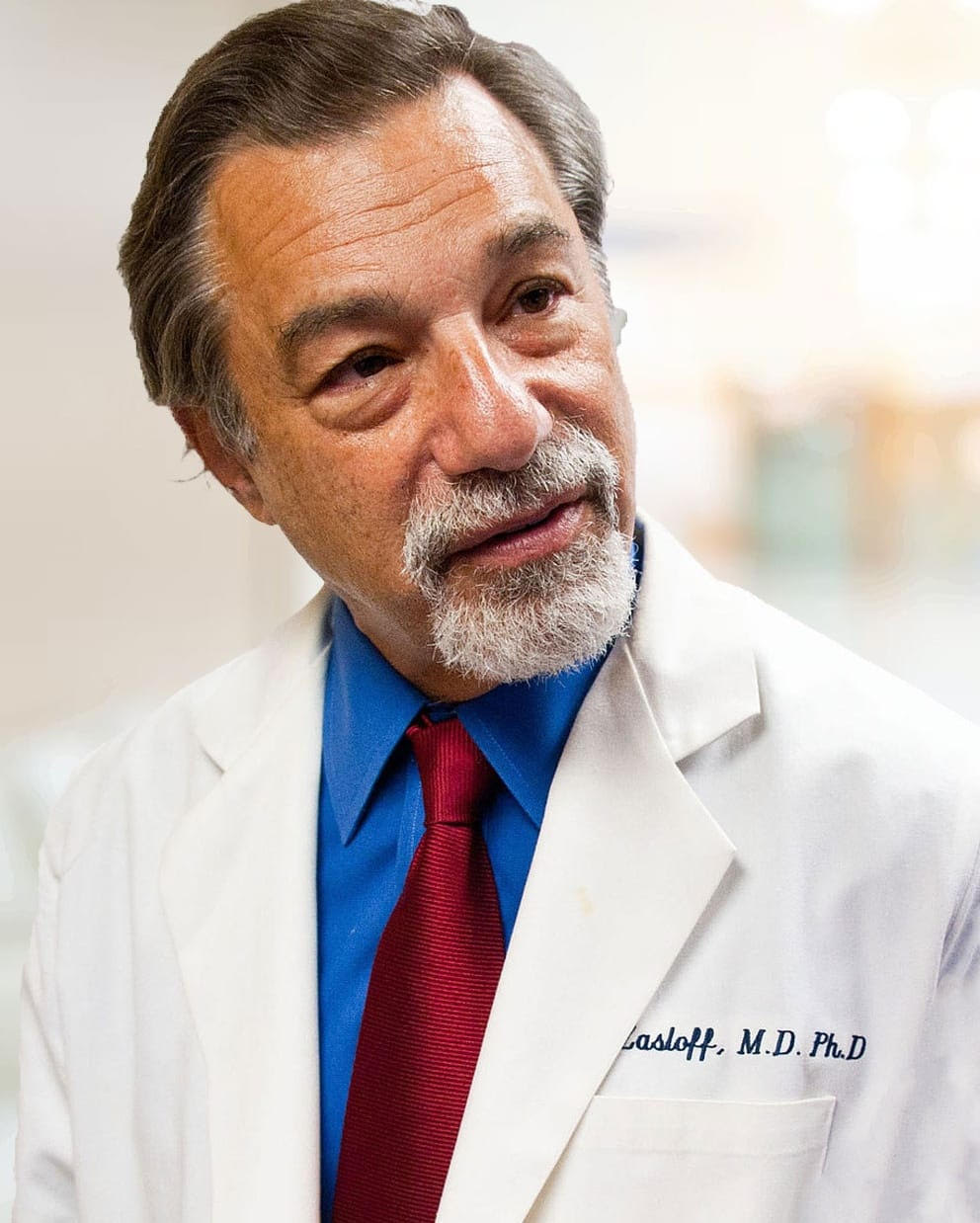
- Born: February 7, 1946 (age 80); New York City, U.S.
- Education: Columbia College, New York University Grossman School of Medicine
- Known for: Discovery of antimicrobial peptides (magainins); development of squalamine
- Awards: Kilby Award (1994); Solomon Berson Award (1998); Doctor of Science, honoris causa, Georgetown University (2012)
- Scientific career
- Fields: Immunology, Pediatrics, Biotechnology
- Workplaces: National Institutes of Health, University of Pennsylvania, Georgetown University

Michael Alan Zasloff (born February 7, 1946) is an American physician–scientist, immunologist, and biotechnology entrepreneur. He is best known for discovering antimicrobial peptides in amphibians, particularly the magainins, and for developing the shark-derived compound squalamine as a potential therapy for viral infections and Parkinson's disease. Zasloff is Professor of Pediatrics and Surgery at Georgetown University School of Medicine and serves as Scientific Director of the MedStar Georgetown Transplant Institute.

== Early life and education ==
Zasloff was born in New York City to a dentist and an artist, and grew up on Manhattan's West Side. He attended the Bronx High School of Science, then earned a B.A. in biochemistry at Columbia College in 1967, and both an M.D. and Ph.D. in biochemistry from the New York University Grossman School of Medicine in 1973, studying under Nobel laureate Severo Ochoa. In Ochoa's laboratory, Zasloff studied protein synthesis in eukaryotic cells and isolated a protein factor that Ochoa called "the Zasloff factor" in his 1980 memoir.

== Career ==
After his pediatric residency at Boston Children's Hospital, Zasloff joined the National Institutes of Health in 1975. From 1982 to 1988 he served as Chief of the Human Genetics Branch at the Eunice Kennedy Shriver National Institute of Child Health and Human Development (NICHD).

In 1988, Zasloff joined the University of Pennsylvania School of Medicine as the Charles E. H. Upham Professor of Pediatrics and Genetics and became Director of the Division of Human Genetics at the Children's Hospital of Philadelphia.

In 1988, Zasloff founded Magainin Pharmaceuticals to develop peptide-based therapeutics. In July 1992, Zasloff left Penn to join Magainin full time as Executive Vice President and President of the Magainin Research Institute, the company's basic research division. In December 1992, Magainin Pharmaceuticals and Sandoz entered into a collaboration of at least 30 months under which Sandoz would develop anticancer compounds and Magainin would develop the remaining compounds as anti-infectives. From July 1996 through November 2000 he served as Vice Chairman of the board of the company.

In 2002, Zasloff joined Georgetown University Medical Center as Dean of Research and Translational Science, tasked with integrating Georgetown's basic science programs with the clinical environment of the medical center. Since 2004, he has conducted research on innate immunity at the MedStar Georgetown Transplant Institute and served as its Scientific Director since 2012. In 2012 he received an honorary Doctor of Science from Georgetown and delivered the School of Medicine's commencement address.

In 2016, Zasloff co-founded Enterin Inc. with neurologist Denise Barbut to develop therapies targeting the gut–brain axis in neurodegenerative disease. The company's lead compound, ENT-01, is an orally administered derivative of squalamine designed to displace aggregated alpha-synuclein in enteric neurons.In a 2022 phase 2b trial of 150 patients with Parkinson’s disease, funded by Enterin, ENT-01 was found to be safe and significantly improved constipation.

== Research ==
In the mid-1980s, while working with African clawed frogs (Xenopus laevis), Zasloff discovered natural antibiotic peptides, which he named magainins (from the Hebrew word for "shield"). They proved active against bacteria, fungi, protozoa, and some viruses. A 1988 Washington Post profile described them as "a remarkable family of natural antibiotics."

At Penn, working with Frederick Kaplan, Zasloff continued research on the cause and treatment of fibrodysplasia ossificans progressiva.

Magainin Pharmaceuticals advanced several drug candidates, including pexiganan, a topical antimicrobial for diabetic foot ulcers, and squalamine, a steroidal compound isolated from the dogfish shark with antibacterial and antiviral properties. Although pexiganan was not approved by the U.S. Food and Drug Administration, Magainin was one of the first companies to commercially develop antimicrobial peptides.

In the early 1990s, Zasloff discovered squalamine, a steroid with broad antimicrobial activity, from dogfish sharks. In 2011, BBC News reported that synthetic squalamine inhibited dengue, hepatitis, and yellow fever viruses in laboratory and animal models. In 2013, Georgetown University Medical Center reported that this antiviral finding had been included in Time Inc.'s book 100 New Scientific Discoveries.

In the early 2010s, Zasloff's work expanded to include studies of the gut–brain axis and its role in neurodegenerative disease.

== Awards and honors ==
- 1987 – Public Health Service Commendation Medal
- 1988 – Public Health Service Meritorious Service Medal
- 1994 – Kilby Award
- 1998 – Solomon A. Berson Award in the Basic Sciences, NYU School of Medicine
- 2001 – Alpha Omega Alpha Honor Medical Society, NYU School of Medicine
- 2012 – Doctor of Science (honoris causa), Georgetown University

He is a member of the Association of American Physicians.

== Personal life ==
Zasloff is married to Barbara Zasloff, a clinical psychologist. They met as undergraduates at Columbia University and have three daughters.

== Selected publications ==
- Zasloff, Michael (1987). "Magainins, a class of antimicrobial peptides from Xenopus skin: isolation, characterization of two active forms, and partial cDNA sequence of a precursor". Proceedings of the National Academy of Sciences. 84 (15): 5449–5453. doi:10.1073/pnas.84.15.5449. PMC 298875. PMID 3299384.
- Moore, K. S.; Wehrli, S.; Roder, H.; Rogers, M.; Forrest, J. N. Jr.; McCrimmon, D.; Zasloff, M. (1993). "Squalamine: an aminosterol antibiotic from the shark". Proceedings of the National Academy of Sciences. 90 (4): 1354–1358. doi:10.1073/pnas.90.4.1354. PMC 45871. PMID 8433993.
- Schonwetter, Barbara S.; Stolzenberg, E. Daniel; Zasloff, Michael A. (1995). "Epithelial antibiotics induced at sites of inflammation". Science. 267 (5204): 1645–1648. doi:10.1126/science.7886453. PMID 7886453.
- Zasloff, Michael (2002). "Antimicrobial peptides of multicellular organisms". Nature. 415 (6870): 389–395. doi:10.1038/415389a. PMID 11807545.
- Shore, Eileen M.; et al. (2006). "A recurrent mutation in the BMP type I receptor ACVR1 causes inherited and sporadic fibrodysplasia ossificans progressiva". Nature Genetics. 38 (5): 525–527. doi:10.1038/ng1783. PMID 16642017.
- Zasloff, Michael; et al. (2011). "Squalamine as a broad-spectrum systemic antiviral agent with therapeutic potential". Proceedings of the National Academy of Sciences. 108 (38): 15978–15983. doi:10.1073/pnas.1108558108. PMC 3179074. PMID 21930925.
- Alam, Md Masud; et al. (2022). "Alpha synuclein, the culprit in Parkinson disease, is required for normal immune function". Cell Reports. 38 (2) 110090. doi:10.1016/j.celrep.2021.110090. PMC 10258816. PMID 35021075.
