= Squalamine =

Names
- IUPAC name (24R)-3β-({3-[(3-Aminopropyl)amino]propyl}amino)-7α-hydroxycholestan-24-yl hydrogen sulfate
- Systematic IUPAC name (3R,6R)-6-[(1R,3aS,3bR,4R,5aR,7S,9aS,9bS,11aR)-7-({3-[(3-Aminopropyl)amino]propyl}amino)-4-hydroxy-9a,11a-dimethylhexadecahydro-1H-cyclopenta[a]phenanthren-1-yl]-2-methylheptan-3-yl hydrogen sulfate

Identifiers
CAS Number	148717-90-2
3D model (JSmol)	Interactive image
ChEMBL	ChEMBL444929; ChEMBL507931
ChemSpider	65407
KEGG	C16841
PubChem CID	72495
UNII	F8PO54Z4V7
CompTox Dashboard (EPA)	DTXSID40869971
- InChI: InChI=1S/C34H65N3O5S/c1-23(2)31(42-43(39,40)41)12-9-24(3)27-10-11-28-32-29(14-16-34(27,28)5)33(4)15-13-26(21-25(33)22-30(32)38)37-20-8-19-36-18-7-6-17-35/h23-32,36-38H,6-22,35H2,1-5H3,(H,39,40,41)/t24-,25-,26+,27-,28+,29+,30-,31-,32+,33+,34-/m1/s1 Key: UIRKNQLZZXALBI-MSVGPLKSSA-N; InChI=1/C34H65N3O5S/c1-23(2)31(42-43(39,40)41)12-9-24(3)27-10-11-28-32-29(14-16-34(27,28)5)33(4)15-13-26(21-25(33)22-30(32)38)37-20-8-19-36-18-7-6-17-35/h23-32,36-38H,6-22,35H2,1-5H3,(H,39,40,41)/t24-,25-,26+,27-,28+,29+,30-,31-,32+,33+,34-/m1/s1 Key: UIRKNQLZZXALBI-MSVGPLKSBB
- SMILES: CC(C)[C@@H](CC[C@@H](C)[C@H]1CC[C@H]2[C@@H]3[C@H](O)C[C@H]4C[C@H](CC[C@]4(C)[C@H]3CC[C@]12C)NCCCNCCCCN)OS(=O)(=O)O

Properties
Chemical formula	C_{34}H_{65}N_{3}O_{5}S
Molar mass	628 g/mol
- Except where otherwise noted, data are given for materials in their standard state (at 25 °C [77 °F], 100 kPa). Infobox references

Squalamine was discovered in a search for anti-microbial compounds in the tissues of primitive vertebrates. The team speculated that animals with primitive immune systems, such as sharks and lampreys, might utilize antimicrobial compounds as a significant component of their immune repertoire. The dogfish shark (Squalus acanthias) was the first shark species studied since it was accessible for research purposes at the Mount Desert Marine Biological Laboratory. In addition, large numbers of dogfish are harvested annually for consumption and could provide sufficient tissue for extraction during the early stages of compound isolation and characterization. The compound was discovered in 1993 by Michael Zasloff, a researcher at Georgetown University, who identified it as an antibiotic steroid extracted from the dogfish shark. The chemical synthesis was developed by William A. Kinney and colleagues.

Squalamine consists of a spermidine coupled to a C-27 sulfated bile salt, a natural product with an unprecedented chemical structure. In addition 7 additional aminosterols were isolated from dogfish liver, including Trodusquemine. Squalamine was later identified in the white blood cells of the lamprey. Squalamine has broad spectrum microbicidal activity, and its use as a therapeutic has been studied preclinically. In the late 1990’s squalamine was discovered to exhibit antiangiogenic activity, and as a consequence was later studied in several early stage clinical trials for both cancer, age related macular degeneration, administered intravenously, and as an eye-drop in combination with intraocular ranibizumab.

In aqueous solution at physiological pH squalamine exists as an amphipathic zwitterion with a net cationic charge. As a consequence the molecule is attracted by electrostatic forces to membranes that display negatively charged phospholipid headgroups, such as the intracellular membranes of animal cells. Once squalamine crosses the plasma membrane of an animal cell it binds to the cytoplasmic surface of the plasma membrane and displaces proteins that are bound electrostatically, a property that explains its inhibition of the sodium-hydrogen transporter type 3, neuronal synaptic AMPA receptors and its broad spectrum antiviral activity.

In 2017, Perni et al reported that squalamine could displace alpha-synuclein from neuronal membranes both in vitro, in isolated cells, and in a C. elegans Parkinson disease model. Since alpha synuclein accumulates within the enteric, peripheral and central nervous system of individuals suffering from Parkinson’s disease where it forms toxic aggregates damaging or killing neurons, squalamine emerged as a potential therapeutic. Studies in mouse models of Parkinson’s disease demonstrated that orally administered squalamine could restore the electrical activity of enteric neurons and thereby restore peristaltic activity, reversing constipation, a non-motor symptom of Parkinson’s disease. Squalamine also restored electrical signaling between the enteric nervous system and the brain ( the “gut-brain axis”). In addition the electrical signals induced by orally administered squalamine phenocopied those elicited by SSRI anti-depressant drugs suggesting that the compound could, via the gut-brain axis, elicit an anti-depressant effect. Based on these preclinical studies squalamine (as the phosphate salt (ENT-01)) was evaluated for the treatment of Parkinson’s disease associated constipation in two clinical trials: RASMET, an open label Phase 1b trial, and subsequently, KARMET, a Phase 2a placebo controlled randomized double blinded trial involving about 150 patients. Both trials, conducted by Enterin, Inc (Philadelphia) demonstrated that a 28 day course of orally administered ENT-03 effectively corrected constipation that had been previously intractable. In addition, positive efficacy signals were seen in circadian rhythm and sleep, dementia and hallucinations. ENT-01 is now (2024) positioned for Phase 3 clinical trials.

== See also ==
- List of investigational antipsychotics
- List of investigational Parkinson's disease drugs
