= Ipsen =

French biopharmaceutical company

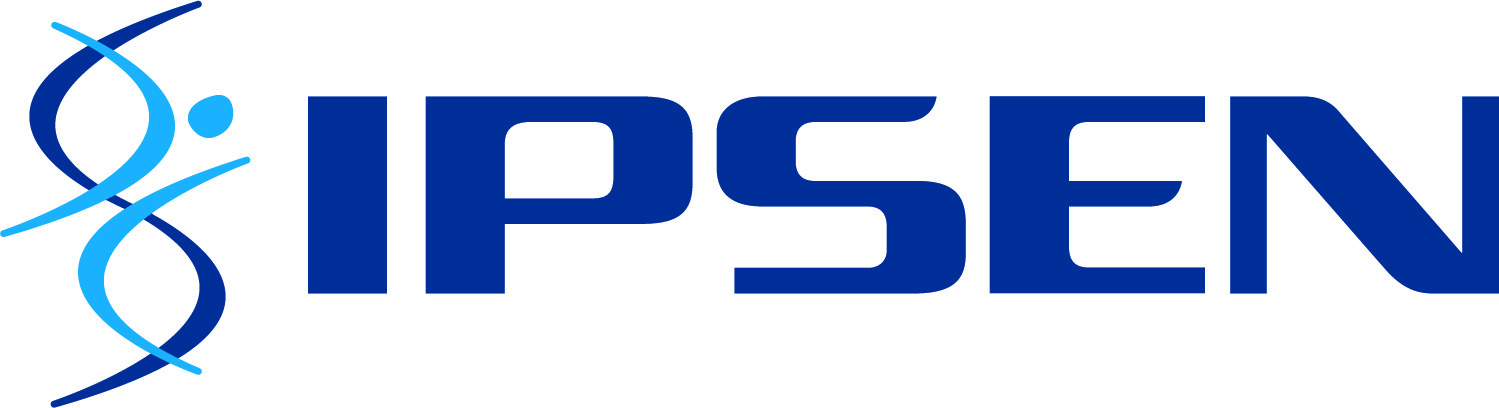
- Type: Public
- Traded as: Euronext Paris: IPN; CAC Next 20
- ISIN: FR0010259150
- Industry: Pharmaceutical
- Founded: 1929
- Founder: Henri Beaufour
- Headquarters: Balard, Paris 15, France
- Key people: Marc de Garidel (Non-executive Chairman); David Loew (Chief Executive Officer)
- Products: List of medicines
- Revenue: ▲€3.401 billion(2024)
- Operating income: ▲€1.109 billion(2024)
- Net income: ▲€347million(2024)
- Number of employees: 5,300
- Website: www.ipsen.com

Ipsen is a French biopharmaceutical company headquartered in Paris, France, with a focus on drug development and commercialization in three therapeutic areas: oncology, rare diseases and neuroscience. Ipsen is one of the world's top 15 biopharmaceutical companies in terms of oncology sales.

Ipsen, founded by Henri Beaufour in 1929, has approximately 5000 employees worldwide. Ipsen's medicines are registered in 88 countries with direct commercial presence in over 30 countries. Ipsen has 4 global R&D hubs and 3 pharmaceutical development centers around the world. Ipsen has been a family-owned business for the past 90 years and is publicly traded on the Euronext Paris as part of the SBF 120 index (2005). The Beaufour family owns 57% of its shares and 73% of its voting rights, and two of its members, Anne Beaufour and Henri Beaufour, sit on its board of directors.

== History ==
In 1929, Dr. Henri Beaufour founded the Beaufour Laboratories in Dreux. The first product marketed was Romarene, a rosemary-based medicine intended for the treatment of digestive disorders, discontinued from the market in 2011.

In the 1950s and 1960s, Laboratoires Beaufour underwent a phase of expansion. In 1954, the group launched betaine citrate, used in the symptomatic treatment of dyspepsia. Henri Beaufour's two sons, Albert and Gérard Beaufour, joined the company. The group opened a factory in Dreux in 1961, and another in L'Isle- sur-la-Sorgue in 1965. A research center opened in Plessis-Robinson the same year.

In the 1970s and 1980s, Laboratoires Beaufour created a subsidiary, Ipsen (1975), and began to internationalize its activities. In 1976, the company opened a research center in Milford (Massachusetts) in the U.S. In 1977, the group launched Smecta (diosmectite clay, a gastrointestinal bandage and anti-diarrhoeal agent).

In 1983, the group created the Fondation Ipsen under the aegis of the Fondation de France, to encourage exchanges between scientists in the field of life sciences.

In 1986, the group launched Decapeptyl, used to treat certain pathologies influenced by sex hormones, such as prostate cancer, endometriosis, uterine fibroids and early puberty.

In the 1990s, the group diversified its activity and continued its international expansion. In 1990, an industrial center was created in Signes, in the Var department. In 1992, the group opened a subsidiary in China. In 1994, the group launched Dysport (type A botulinum toxin for the treatment of muscle spasms) after acquiring the British company Speywood (then called Porton International). The same year, the group opened a subsidiary in Russia.

In 1995, the group launched Somatuline, used to treat hypersecretion of growth hormones (acromegaly) and in neuro-endocrine tumors, and in 1996, Forlax was launched.

In 2000, after the death of Albert Beaufour, the company was taken over by his children, Anne Beaufour and Henri Beaufour.

In 2003, the company changed its name to Ipsen and in 2005, it was listed on the Paris Stock Exchange on Euronext. In 2004, the company inaugurated a new botulinum toxin production unit in Wrexham (UK). In 2007, the company established a partnership with Galderma for botulinum toxin type A products in aesthetic medicine. In addition, somatuline was granted marketing authorization in the United States for the treatment of acromegaly.

In 2007, Ipsen shares were included in the SBF 120 stock market index.

In 2007, Dysport was granted marketing authorization in the United States for certain indications in therapeutic and aesthetic medicine. Decapeptyl 6-month formulation receives marketing authorization in 9 European countries from the European Medicines Agency.

In 2011, Ipsen announced a new strategy focusing on several areas, including a refocus on specialty medicine, research and development and international development. In 2013, Ipsen acquired the British company Syntaxin, a leader in the engineering of recombinant botulinum toxin^{11}. In 2014, the company participated in the creation of a joint laboratory with the CNRS – Archi-Pex -, the Commissariat à l'énergie atomique et aux énergies alternatives and the University of Rennes^{1}, with the aim of designing and developing hormone peptides.

In 2015, Ipsen inaugurated a research and development center in Cambridge, Massachusetts.

In 2016, Dysport Injection was approved in the United States for the treatment of lower limb spasticity in children aged two years and older.

In 2016, Ipsen licensed cabozantinib from Exelixis, which received marketing authorization the same year for the second-line treatment of advanced renal cell carcinoma. In January 2017, Ipsen announced the acquisition of certain assets of Merrimack Pharmaceuticals, including Onivyde, for the treatment of pancreatic and ovarian cancer.

In 2019, Ipsen acquired Montreal-based Clementia Pharmaceuticals, specializing in rare bone diseases,^{,}^{,}. Clementia brought a drug candidate, palovarotene, to Ipsen for a rare genetic disease, fibrodysplasia ossificans progressiva (FOP).

In February 2022, Ipsen announced the proposed sale of the Consumer HealthCare (CHC) division after entering into exclusive negotiations with the French laboratory Mayoly Spindler. In July 2022, Ipsen completed the divestment of the CHC business to Mayoly Spindler.

In August 2022, Ipsen successfully completed the acquisition of Epizyme and its lead medicine, Tazverik® (tazemetostat), a first-in-class, chemotherapy-free EZH2a inhibitor for adults with relapsed or refractory follicular lymphoma (FL), which was granted Accelerated Approval by the U.S. Food and Drug Administration (FDA) in 2020. As part of the transaction, Ipsen also acquired Epizyme's first-in-class, oral SETD2 inhibitor development candidate.

In January 2023, Ipsen announced it would acquire rare disease specialist Albireo for $952m, bringing into its portfolio Bylvay (odevixibat), a non-systemic ileal bile acid transport inhibitor for the treatment of paediatric patients with pruritus in progressive familial intrahepatic cholestasis (PFIC).

In August 2023, The U.S. Food and Drug Administration (FDA) approved Sohonos for the treatment of fibrodysplasia ossificans progressiva (FOP), a rare genetic connective tissue disease that causes progressive loss of mobility and shortened life expectancy, in adults and children. It can be used for girls aged 8 years and older and boys aged 10 years and older. The estimated annual cost of the drug is from $624,000. The disease occurs in 1 in 1,600,000 newborns, with about 800 people now known to have the disease.

In February 2024, Ipsen received FDA approval for Onivyde (irinotecan liposome injection), which is used in combination with oxaliplatin, fluorouracil, and leucovorin (NALIRIFOX) for the first-line treatment of patients with metastatic pancreatic adenocarcinoma (mPDAC). Pancreatic cancer accounts for approximately 3% of all cancer diagnoses in the United States and approximately 7% of all cancer deaths. PDAC is the most common form of the disease, with more than 60,000 diagnoses in the United States each year and approximately 500,000 diagnoses worldwide.

In June 2024, Ipsen received accelerated approval from the US FDA for Iqirvo elafibranor based on positive Phase III ELATIVE trial data. elafibranor is a treatment for primary biliary cholangitis (PBC) in combination with ursodeoxycholic acid (UDCA) in adults who have an inadequate response to UDCA, or as monotherapy in patients unable to tolerate UDCA.

In October 2025, Ipsen announced that it had entered into a definitive share purchase agreement to acquire all issued and outstanding shares of ImCheck Therapeutics. ImCheck is a privately held France France biotechnology company specializing in a new generation of immunotherapeutic antibodies.

== Controversies ==
As of March 2022, Ipsen announced the suspension of certain promotional activities in Russia, including advertising and participation in non-scientific congresses. Additionally, the company decided not to initiate any new clinical trials in the country. Despite Russian invasion in Ukraine, Ipsen continues to serve patients in Russia, maintaining the availability of its existing medications.

== Financial Data ==
Financial data in EUR millions								
Year	2017	2018	2019	2020	2021	2022	2023	2024
Total sales	1,908.7	2,224.8	2,576.2	2,591.6	2,643.3	3,025.0	3,127.5	3,400.6
Change vs prior year – at actual exchange rates	21.1%	16.6%	15,8%	3.5%	10.7%	14.4%	3.4%	9.9%
Core operating margin	20.8%	29.7%	30,4%	32,0%	35.2%	36.9%	32.0%	32.6%
Employees	5,400	5,700	5,800	5,700	5,700	5,700	5,200	5300

== Shareholding ==
Ownership of Ipsen's share capital (% of total capital) as of 31 December 2025:

Name	% of total capital
Free float	40.08%
Beech Tree	26.03%
Highrock	26.03%
Treasury shares	1.70%
FinHestia	4.58%
Other registered shareholders	0.94%
Employee	0.29%
Directors (others)	0.28%

== Medicines ==
=== In Oncology ===
Cabometyx (cabozantinib) is a tyrosine kinase inhibitor (TKI) used in the treatment of advanced kidney cancer (renal cell carcinoma), liver cancer (hepatocellular carcinoma) in adults previously treated with the medicine sorafenib, as well as in radioiodine-refractory differentiated thyroid cancer (RAI-R DTC) after prior systemic therapy

Decapeptyl (triptorelin) is an analogue of the natural gonadotropin-releasing hormone (GnRH), approved for the treatment of locally advanced metastatic prostate cancer, central precocious puberty (CPP), endometriosis, uterine fibroma, and in-vitro fertilization, and used as adjuvant treatment in combination with tamoxifen or an aromatase inhibitor for women at high-risk of breast cancer recurrence.

Somatuline (lanreotide) is a synthetic version of the natural hormone somatostatin, which is found naturally in the human body. Used for the treatment of neuroendocrine tumors (NETs), carcinoid syndrome or acromegaly.

Onivyde (irinotecan liposome injection) is prescribed in combination with fluorouracil (5-FU) and leucovorin (LV), for the treatment of patients with metastatic adenocarcinoma of the pancreas after disease progression following gemcitabine-based therapy.

Tazverik is an inhibitor of the enzyme EZH2 (enhancer of zeste homologue 2) used to treat follicular lymphoma, which is a cancer of the immune system, as well as epithelioid sarcoma which is a rare, slow-growing type of soft tissue cancer which often begin in the soft tissue under the skin of a finger, hand, forearm, lower leg or foot, and in the abdomen or pelvic area.

In March 2026, Ipsen voluntarily withdrew Tazverik® (tazemetostat) from the market as a precautionary measure following a reassessment of the medicine's benefit–risk profile. The company stated that the decision was taken in consultation with health authorities after emerging data raised uncertainties regarding the treatment's long‑term efficacy and safety in adults with relapsed or refractory follicular lymphoma. The withdrawal applied to all remaining commercial supplies and ongoing distribution of the drug.

These indications are approved under FDA accelerated approval based on overall response rate and duration of response. Continued approval for these indications may be contingent upon verification and description of clinical benefit in a confirmatory trial(s).

=== In Rare Disease ===
Increlex (mecasermin) injection is a prescription medicine used to treat children who are very short for their age because their bodies do not make enough IGF-1. This condition is called primary IGF-1 deficiency. Increlex was sold to Euton Pharmaceuticals in December 2024.

Bylvay (odevixibat) is a non‑systemic ileal bile acid transporter (IBAT) inhibitor used in the treatment of progressive familial intrahepatic cholestasis (PFIC) in young patients. It is approved in the United States for individuals from three months of age and in the European Union from six months of age. The medicine is also indicated for cholestatic pruritus in patients with Alagille syndrome (ALGS), with age thresholds varying by region.

Iqirvo (elafibranor) is an oral peroxisome proliferator‑activated receptor alpha/delta (PPAR‑α/δ) agonist indicated for the treatment of primary biliary cholangitis (PBC), an autoimmune liver disease characterized by the progressive destruction of small bile ducts. The medicine is approved in the United States and conditionally approved in the European Union for use in adults with an inadequate response to ursodeoxycholic acid (UDCA) or for those who cannot tolerate UDCA.

Sohonos (palovarotene) is an oral investigational, selective retinoic-acid receptor gamma (RARγ) agonist being developed as a potential treatment for people living with the debilitating ultra-rare genetic disorder fibrodysplasia ossificans progressiva (FOP).

=== In Neuroscience ===
Dysport (Botulinum toxin) is a prescription medicine used for pathologies characterized by involuntary and uncomfortable muscle contractions (dystonias: blepharospasm, spasmodic torticollis, hemifacial spasm; spasticity: spasticity of the upper or lower limb, dynamic deformation of the equine foot). This drug is also used in aesthetic medicine to temporarily reduce certain wrinkles.

== Fondation Ipsen ==
The Fondation Ipsen pour la recherche thérapeutique, created in 1983 under the aegis of the Fondation de France, supports work in the field of therapeutic research. In particular is focused on helping improve the lives of patients with rare diseases.

It has contributed to numerous major advances in biological and medical research, organized scientific conferences, and produced literature and content to help patients and the wider community understand rare diseases.

Since 2007, Fondation Ipsen has initiated several series of meetings in partnership with the Salk Institute, the Karolinska Institutet, the Massachusetts General Hospital, the DMMGF (Days of Molecular Medicine Global Foundation), as well as with the journals Nature, Cell and Science. The Fondation Ipsen has published more than 100 books and awarded more than 250 prizes and grants.

In 2021, Fondation Ipsen worked directly with 146 organizations to assess the needs of patients with rare diseases. Fondation Ipsen and Science Magazine organized 9 webinars with the world's leading specialists in rare diseases, as well as policymakers from all over the world.The webinars addressed a variety of essential topics for patients living with rare diseases and their families. The webinars received such a strong response that Science Magazine and the Fondation now co-publish an international magazine for the rare disease community: The Rare Disease Gazette.
