= Fibrodysplasia ossificans progressiva =

Disease in which fibrous connective tissue turns into bone

- Other names: Stone man disease, Münchmeyer disease
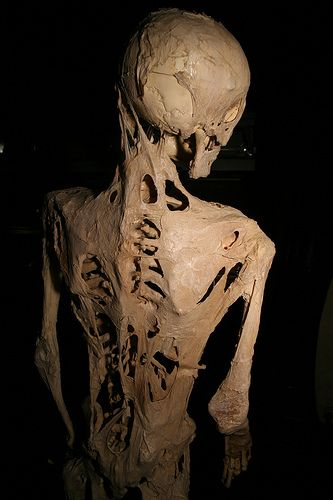
- The skeleton of Harry Raymond Eastlack, a fibrodysplasia ossificans progressiva patient, showing characteristic abnormal bone growth
- Specialty: Medical genetics, rheumatology
- Symptoms: Continuous bone growth
- Complications: Joint immobility, dysphagia, thoracic insufficiency syndrome
- Usual onset: Before age 10
- Duration: Life-long
- Types: Classic FOP, Atypical FOP
- Causes: Heterozygous activating mutation in the ACVR1 gene
- Diagnostic method: Heterotopic ossification, genetic ACVR1 sequencing
- Differential diagnosis: Fibrous dysplasia, Progressive osseous heteroplasia,
- Treatment: Targeted therapy and supportive care
- Medication: Palovarotene, trade name Sohonos
- Prognosis: Median life expectancy is around 40 years old (if properly managed)
- Frequency: 834 confirmed cases worldwide (2020); incidence rate estimated to be 0.88 cases per million people
- Deaths: 60

Fibrodysplasia ossificans progressiva (/ˌfaɪbroʊdɪˈspleɪʒ(i)ə ɒˈsɪfɪkænz prəˈɡrɛsɪvə/; abbr. FOP), also called Münchmeyer disease or formerly myositis ossificans progressiva, is an extremely rare connective tissue disease. Fibrous connective tissue such as muscle, tendons, and ligaments ossify into bone tissue. The condition ultimately immobilises sufferers, as new bone replaces musculature and fuses with the existing skeleton. This has earned FOP the nickname "stone man disease".

FOP is caused by a mutation of the gene ACVR1, affecting the body's repair mechanism. Fibrous tissue, including muscle, tendons, and ligaments ossify, either spontaneously or when damaged by trauma. In many cases, otherwise minor injuries can cause joints to permanently fuse as new bone forms, replacing the damaged muscle tissue. This new bone formation (known as "heterotopic ossification") eventually forms a secondary skeleton progressively restricting the patient's ability to move. Circumstantial evidence suggests that the disease can cause joint degradation separate from its characteristic bone growth. It is a severe, debilitating disorder.

Bone formed as a result of ossification is identical to "normal" bone, but in improper locations. The rate of ossified bone growth varies by patient. It is the only known medical condition in which tissue of one organ system changes into that of another.

Surgical removal of ossified bone causes the body to "repair" the affected area with additional bone. FOP has no current known cure. However, there are intermittent treatments such as anti-inflammatory drugs. Promising breakthroughs include the approved treatment, Sohonos (palovarotene). Another promising treatment is Antisense-mediated therapy using allele-selective LNA gapmers.

== History ==
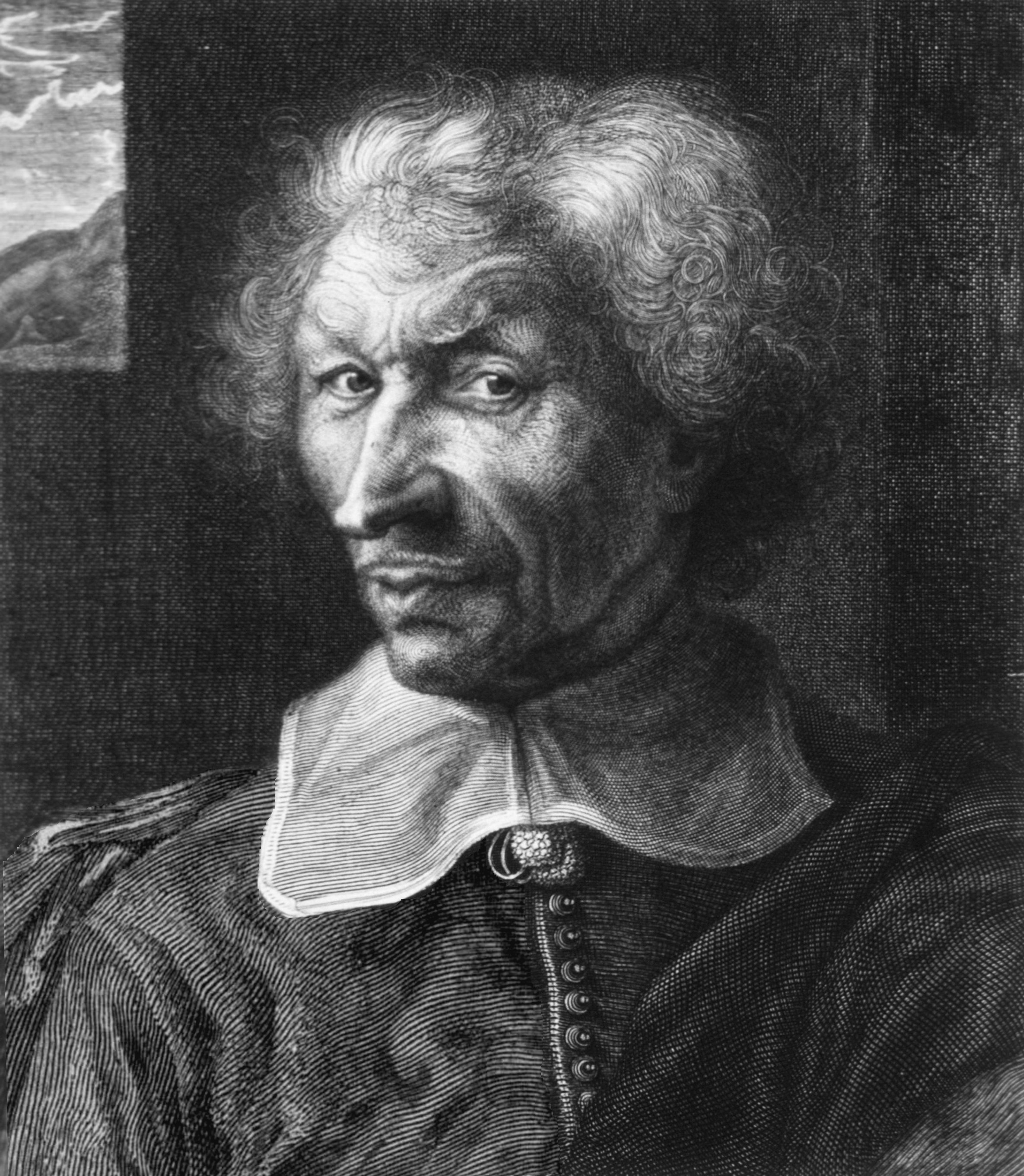
Dr. Guy Patin († 1671) first described FOP, which he said caused men to become as "stone", in 1648

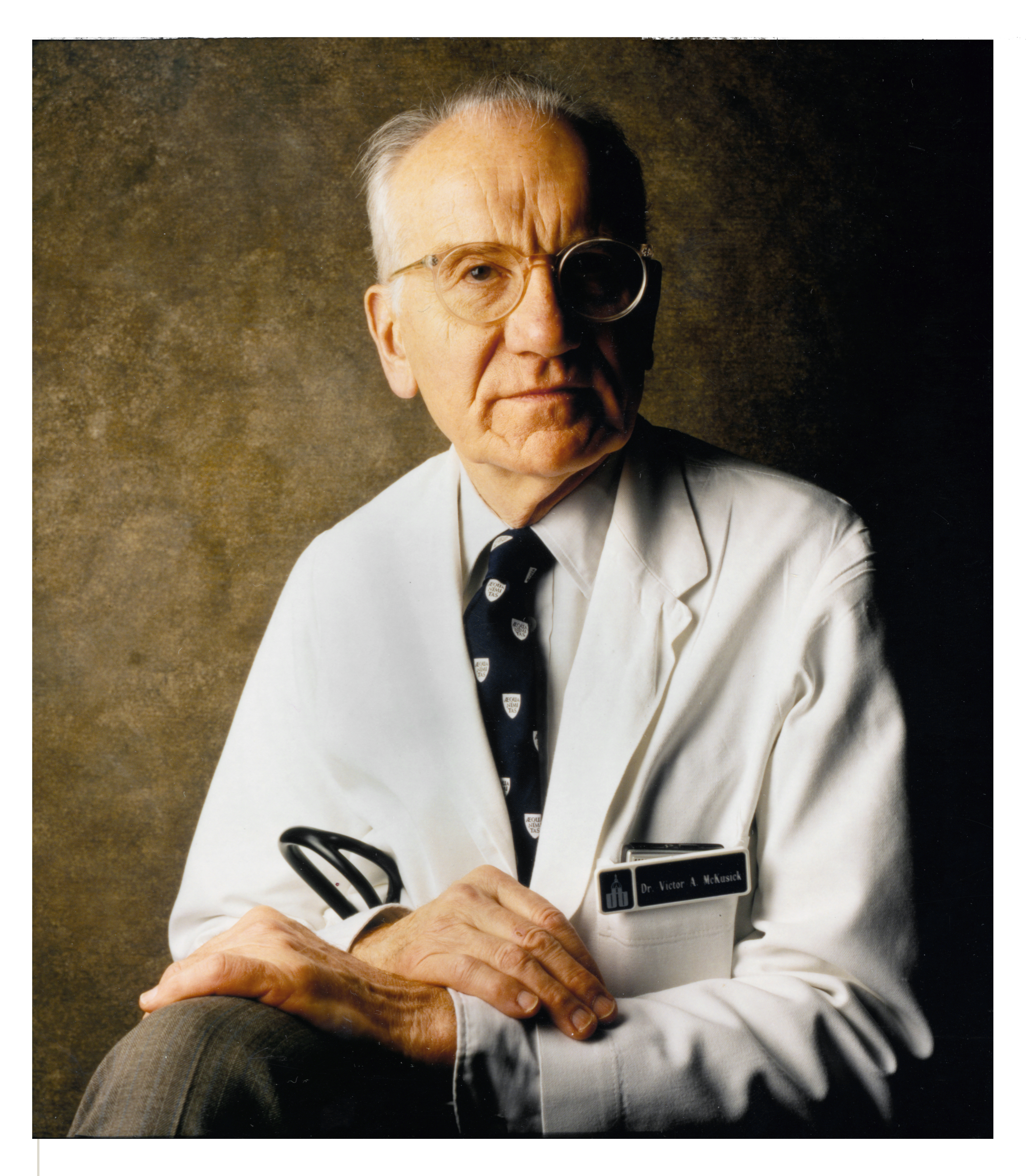
Dr. Victor A. McKusick gave the disease its modern name in 1970, when he discovered it does not only affect muscle.

Medical reports describing individuals affected by FOP date back to Dr. Guy Patin in 1648. FOP was originally called myositis ossificans progressiva and was thought to be caused by muscular inflammation (myositis) that caused bone formation. In 1736, London surgeon, John Freke wrote the first case report of FOP, describing a 14-year-old boy that exhibited "'many large swellings on his back, that arise from all the vertebrae of the neck and reach down to the os sacrum. They likewise arise from every rib of his body, and joining together in all parts of his back, as the ramifications of coral do, they make, as it were, a fixed bony pair of bodice." The disease was renamed by Victor A. McKusick in 1970 following the discovery that soft tissue other than muscles (e.g. ligaments) were also affected by the disease process.

The best known FOP case is that of Harry Eastlack (1933–1973). His condition began to develop at the age of ten, and by the time of his death from pneumonia in November 1973, six days before his 40th birthday, his body had completely ossified, leaving him able to move only his lips. Eastlack never met another person with FOP during his lifetime.

Eastlack donated his body to science and his skeleton is now at the Mütter Museum in Philadelphia, and has proven to be an invaluable source of information in the study of FOP. Another person with FOP, Carol Orzel (April 20, 1959 – February 2018), also donated her body to the museum. Her skeleton was placed on exhibit there, adjacent to Eastlack's, in February 2019.

== Epidemiology ==
As of 2020, approximately 800 cases of FOP have been confirmed worldwide, making FOP one of the rarest diseases known. However, statistical estimates place the true number closer to several thousand.

While historical estimates placed the global prevalence of FOP at 0.5 cases per million people, more recent studies suggest this is an underestimate as a result of underdiagnosis in FOP reporting. A 2021 study estimated the adjusted prevalence in the United States as 0.88 per million residents, while a 2017 study in France found a prevalence of 1.36 per million.

Reported regional estimates can differ significantly, from 0.04 per million in Asia to 0.65 per million in North America. This is attributed largely to disparities in healthcare and patient identification, not actual genetic variation as it affects all ethnicities.

== Causes ==
FOP is caused by an autosomal dominant allele on chromosome 2q23-24. The allele has variable expressivity, but complete penetrance. Most cases are caused by spontaneous mutation in the gametes; most people with FOP cannot or choose not to have children. A similar but less catastrophic disease is fibrous dysplasia, which is caused by a post-zygotic mutation.

A mutation in the gene ACVR1 (also known as activin-like kinase 2 (ALK2)) is responsible for the disease. ACVR1 encodes activin receptor type-1, a BMP type-1 receptor. The mutation causes substitution of codon 206 from arginine to histidine in the ACVR1 protein. This substitution causes abnormal activation of ACVR1, leading to the transformation of connective tissue and muscle tissue into a secondary skeleton. This causes endothelial cells to transform to mesenchymal stem cells and then to bone. Normally, the ACVR1 gene encodes the activin receptor type-1 transmembrane kinase that bind BMP receptors (Type I BMPR and Type II BMPR) for chondrogenesis signaling. BMPs belong to a superfamily of proteins known as Transforming growth factor-beta (TGF-β) proteins. The binding of ACVR1 protein to BMP receptors start a signaling cascade that is crucial for inducing endochondral bone formation during development, as well as, skeletal and tissue homeostasis.

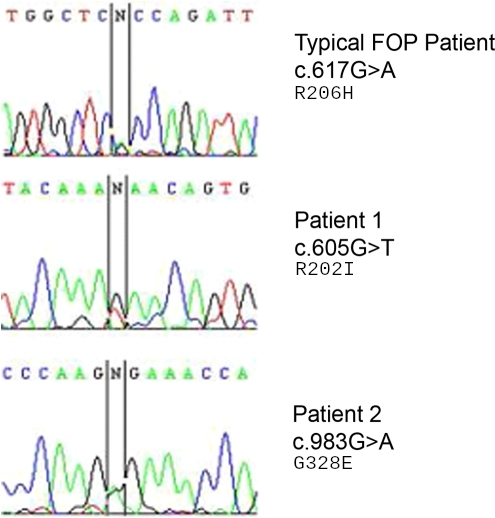
DNA sequencing electropherograms of a typical FOP patient being compared to two other patients. The unsure base "N" indicates site heterozygous for mutation and wild-type gene.

FOP is an autosomal dominant disorder. Thus, a child of an affected heterozygous parent and an unaffected parent has a 50% probability of being affected. Two affected individuals can produce unaffected children. Two unaffected individuals can produce an affected offspring as a result of the mutation of the gene. The homozygous dominant form is more severe than the heterozygous form.

The protein that causes ossification is normally deactivated by an inhibitory protein after a fetus's bones are formed in the womb, but in patients with FOP, the protein keeps working. Aberrant bone formation in patients with FOP occurs when injured connective tissue or muscle cells at the sites of injury or growth incorrectly express an enzyme for bone repair during apoptosis (self-regulated cell death), resulting in lymphocytes containing excess bone morphogenetic protein 4 (BMP4) provided during the immune system response. The bone that results occurs independently of the normal skeleton, forming its own discrete skeletal elements. These elements, however, can fuse with normal skeletal bone. The diaphragm, tongue, and extra-ocular muscles are spared in this process, as well as cardiac and smooth muscle. Since the incorrect enzyme remains unresolved within the immune response, the body continues providing the incorrect BMP4-containing lymphocytes. BMP4 is a product that contributes to the development of the skeleton in the normal embryo.

The ACVR1 gene encodes a bone morphogenic protein (BMP) receptor; this gene is mutated in FOP. It is responsible for growth and development of bone and muscles. The typical mutation, R202H, makes the inhibitor FKBP1A bind less tightly to the activation GS-loop. The result is that ACVR1 is not effectively turned off, and an overgrowth of bone and cartilage and fusion of joints occurs. Atypical mutations involving other residues work similarly. In some cases, the receptor can end up signalling that it's active without being bound to its activating ligand.

Most cases of FOP are the result of a new gene mutation: these people had no history of this particular disorder in their family. There are some cases where the individual has inherited the mutation from one affected parent.

== Signs and symptoms ==
For unknown reasons, children born with FOP often have malformed big toes, sometimes missing a joint or, in other cases, simply presenting with a notable lump at the minor joint. The first "flare-up" that leads to the formation of FOP bone usually occurs before the age of 10. The bone growth generally progresses from the top of the body downward, just as bones grow in fetuses. A child with FOP will typically develop additional bones starting at the neck, then at the shoulders, arms, chest area, and finally at the feet.

Specifically, ossification is typically first seen in the dorsal, axial, cranial, and proximal regions of the body. Later, the disease progresses in the ventral, appendicular, caudal, and distal regions. However, it does not necessarily occur in this order due to injury-caused flare-ups. Often, the tumor-like lumps that characterize a flare-up of the disease appear suddenly.

Bone growth occurring during flare-ups may result in the loss of mobility to affected joints, including, if the jaw/mandible is involved, the inability to fully open the mouth, limiting speech and eating. Bone growth can also result in the immobilization of the hip or knee, affecting the individual's ability to walk. Extra bone formation around the rib cage restricts the expansion of lungs and diaphragm causing respiratory complications.

Since the disorder is incredibly rare, only occurring in 1 out of 2 million people, the condition may be misdiagnosed as cancer or fibrosis. Misdiagnoses can lead physicians to order biopsies, potentially exacerbating the growth of FOP bone. The presence of malformed toes or thumbs in those born with FOP helps distinguish this disorder from other skeletal problems.

With proper medical management the median age of survival is 40 years. However, delayed diagnosis, trauma, and infections can decrease life expectancy.

== Diagnosis ==
FOP is diagnosed based on a combination of clinical features, imaging studies, and genetic testing. Hallmark clinical features of FOP include congenital malformations of the large toes (hallux valgus) and episodes of painful soft tissue swelling. The characteristic features of FOP on radiographs and CT scan include extraosseous bone formation in soft tissue, forming corticated bone in ribbons, sheets or bridges across joints. During flare-ups, MRI and ultrasound are sensitive for preosseous lessions, including soft tissue edema and enhancement prior to ossification. PET scans can identify early, metabolically active lesions, and can predict future sites of ossification. Molecular genetic testing for FOP includes sequence analysis of the ACVR1 gene.

Early diagnosis of this disorder through radiology is very important to avoid unnecessary invasive investigations like biopsies. The smallest or trivial trauma or intramuscular injections can amplify progression of the disease through inflammation hence the favorability of radiology. Clinicians should be aware of this rare entity, as it is frequently misdiagnosed as cancer or other benign entities such as infection, resulting in biopsies that can often hasten disease progression.

== Treatment ==
=== Pitfalls ===
Notably, attempts to surgically remove bone in a FOP patient may result in explosive growth of new bone. While undergoing anesthesia, people with FOP may encounter difficulties with intubation, restrictive pulmonary disease, and changes in the electrical conduction system of the heart. Activities that increase the risk of falling or soft tissue injury should be avoided, as even minor trauma may provoke heterotopic ossification. Intramuscular injections, including immunizations, should likewise be avoided in individuals with FOP, as these can also trigger ossification.

Currently, surgery is not usually recommended for people with FOP as it can incite rapid bone formation at incision sites or where sutures have been applied to muscle or connective tissue. Life-saving surgery may be considered; however, developing a surgical plan with input from a FOP specialist may be considered best practice. Surgical release of joint contractures is generally unsuccessful and risks new, trauma-induced heterotopic ossification.

=== Medical treatments ===
Palovarotene (Sohonos) was approved for medical use in the United States in 2023. Palovarotene is a highly selective retinoic acid receptor gamma (RARγ) agonist that has been shown to reduce the volume of new heterotopic ossification in people (males >10 years, females >8 years).

Garetosmab (Pasatru) was approved for medical use in the United States in August 2026.

Zilurgisertib (Atebrioz) was approved for medical use in the United States in September 2026.

=== Research ===
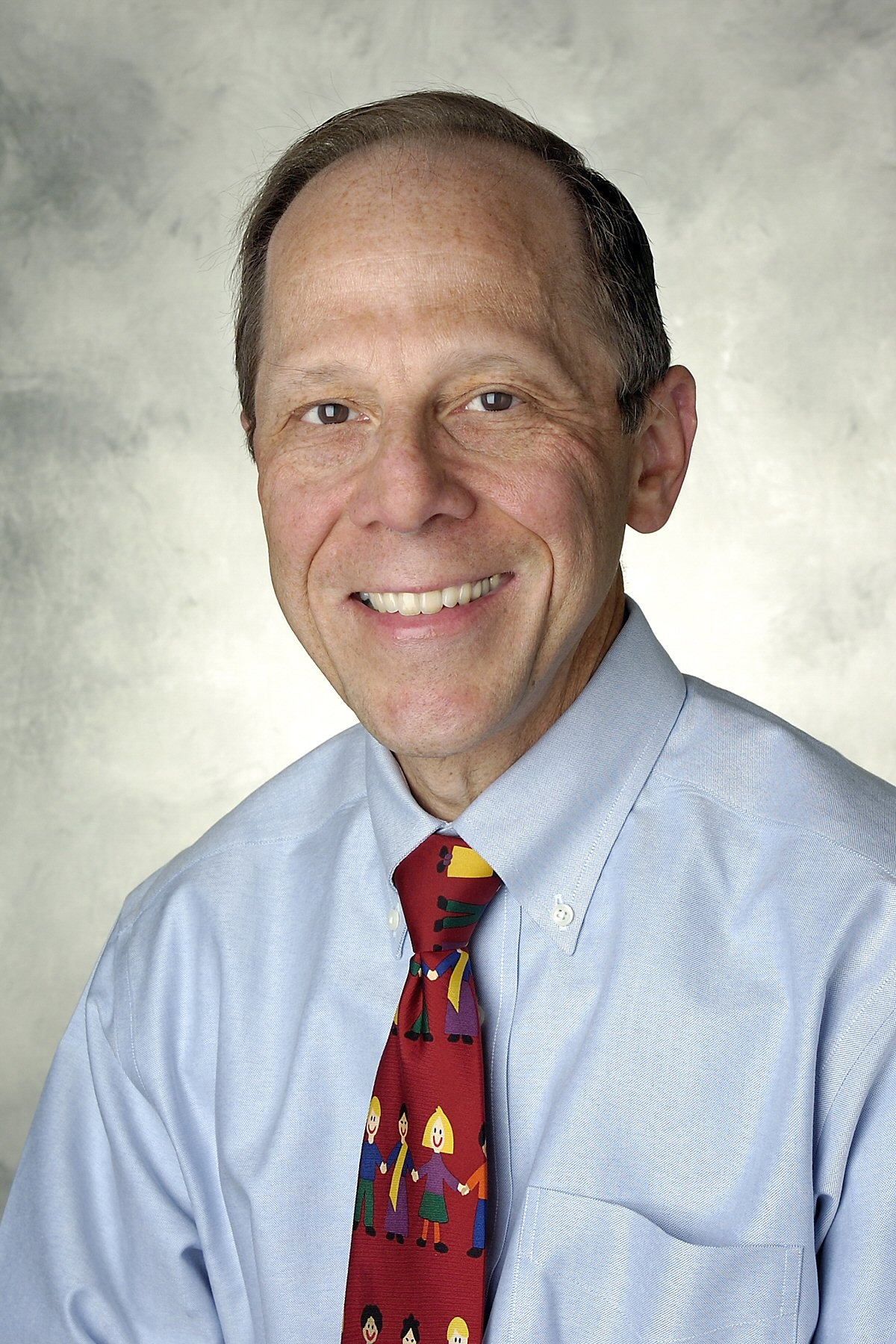
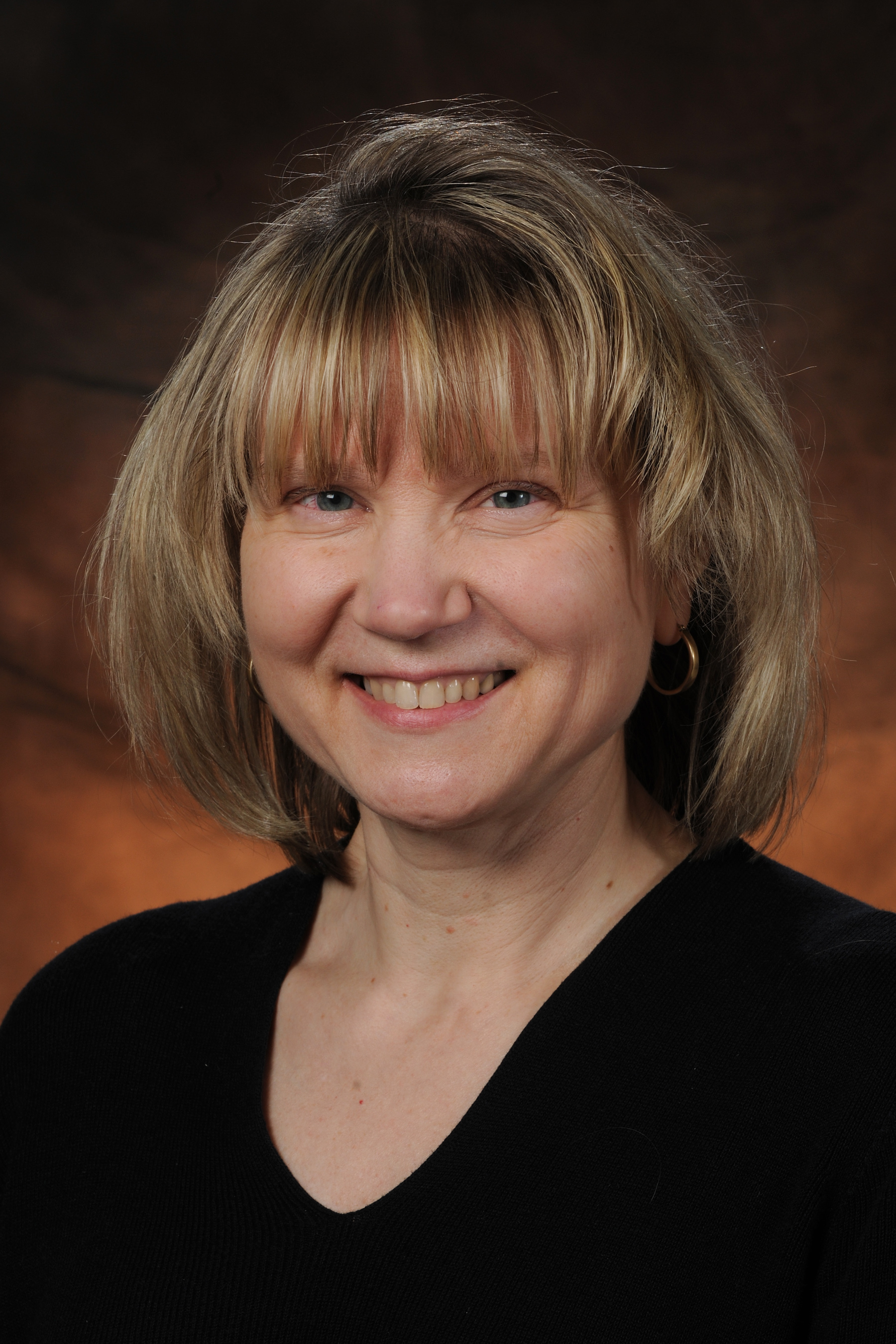
Drs. Frederick Kaplan and Eileen Shore are responsible for much of the modern medical understanding of, and progress in the treatment of, FOP.

Clinical trials of isotretinoin, etidronate with oral corticosteroids, and perhexiline maleate have failed to demonstrate effectiveness, though the variable course of the disease and small prevalence induces uncertainty.

A handful of pharmaceutical companies focused on rare diseases are currently in varying stages of investigation into different therapeutic approaches for FOP.

In August 2015, the U.S. Food and Drug Administration (FDA) Office of Orphan Products Development granted La Jolla Pharmaceuticals orphan drug designation for two novel compounds for FOP. The compounds are small-molecule protein kinase inhibitors designed to selectively block ACVR1 (ALK2).

In August 2015, Clementia Pharmaceuticals began the enrollment of children (ages 6 and above) into its Phase II clinical trial investigating palovarotene for the treatment of FOP. Preclinical studies demonstrated that palovarotene, a retinoic acid receptor gamma agonist, blocked abnormal bone formation in animal models by inhibition of secondary messenger systems in the BMP pathway. Clementia licensed palovarotene from Roche Pharmaceuticals, which previously evaluated the compound in more than 800 individuals including healthy volunteers and patients with chronic obstructive pulmonary disease. Palovarotene received Fast Track designation from the FDA and orphan designations for the treatment of FOP from both the FDA and the European Medicines Agency (EMA). In the pivotal phase 3 MOVE trial published in 2023, Sohonos was shown to reduce new heterotropic ossification by 54-60%.

Another promising treatment is antisense-mediated therapy, specifically using allele-selective LNA gapmers. Allele-specific RNA interference targets mutated mRNA for degradation while preserving normal ACVR1 gene expression. This approach targets the mutated ACVR1 gene, which causes heterotopic ossification by responding aberrantly to activin A. In recent studies, LNA gapmers effectively reduced the expression of the pathogenic ACVR1R206H transcript while sparing the wild-type ACVR1 gene, thus selectively suppressing osteogenic differentiation associated with FOP. This novel antisense approach offers potential for therapeutic application in FOP, representing a breakthrough in targeted genetic treatment for this and potentially other autosomal dominant disorders.

Further investigation into the mechanisms of heterotopic bone formation in FOP could aid in the development of treatments for other disorders involving extra-skeletal bone formation.

Fibro-adipogenic progenitors (FAPs) may be the disease-causing cell type responsible for activin A dependent ectopic bone formation in both the muscles and tendons of mice bearing the FOP causing ACVR1(R206H) mutation.

In December 2019, Ipsen issued a partial clinical hold for people under the age of 14, due to reports of early fusion of growth plates.

As of 2021, a potential therapeutic candidate, saracatinib, was in phase III clinical trials as a potent heterotopic ossification inhibitor in wild-type and ACVR1 mutant mice.

== See also ==
- International FOP Association – American organization
- Osteogenesis imperfecta – Group of genetic disorders resulting in fragile bones, a condition characterized by bones breaking unusually easily, caused by mutations in genes related to those responsible for FOP
- Progressive osseous heteroplasia – Rare genetic condition characterised by cutaneous or subcutaneous ossification
- FOP Friends
