= Palovarotene =

Chemical compound

Clinical data
- Trade names: Sohonos
- Other names: R-667, RG-667
- AHFS/Drugs.com: Monograph
- MedlinePlus: a623038
- License data: US DailyMed: Palovarotene
- Pregnancy category: AU: X (High risk)
- Routes of administration: By mouth
- Drug class: Retinoic acid receptor gamma agonist
- ATC code: M09AX11 (WHO)

Legal status
- Legal status: AU: S4 (Prescription only); CA: ℞-only; US: ℞-only

Identifiers
- IUPAC name: 4-[(E)-2-[5,5,8,8-tetramethyl-3-(1H-pyrazol-1-ylmethyl)-5,6,7,8-tetrahydronaphthalen-2-yl]ethenyl]benzoic acid
- CAS Number: 410528-02-8
- PubChem CID: 10295295
- DrugBank: DB05467
- ChemSpider: 8470763
- UNII: 28K6I5M16G
- KEGG: D09365
- ChEBI: CHEBI:188559
- CompTox Dashboard (EPA): DTXSID301025696

Chemical and physical data
- Formula: C_{27}H_{30}N_{2}O_{2}
- Molar mass: 414.549 g·mol^{−1}
- 3D model (JSmol): Interactive image
- SMILES: CC1(CCC(C2=C1C=C(C(=C2)/C=C/C3=CC=C(C=C3)C(=O)O)CN4C=CC=N4)(C)C)C
- InChI: InChI=1S/C27H30N2O2/c1-26(2)12-13-27(3,4)24-17-22(18-29-15-5-14-28-29)21(16-23(24)26)11-8-19-6-9-20(10-7-19)25(30)31/h5-11,14-17H,12-13,18H2,1-4H3,(H,30,31)/b11-8+; Key:YTFHCXIPDIHOIA-DHZHZOJOSA-N

Palovarotene, sold under the brand name Sohonos, is a medication used for the treatment of heterotopic ossification and fibrodysplasia ossificans progressiva. It is a highly selective retinoic acid receptor gamma (RARγ) agonist. It is taken by mouth.

It was approved for medical use in Canada in June 2022, and in the United States in August 2023. The US Food and Drug Administration (FDA) considers it to be a first-in-class medication.

== Medical uses ==
Palovarotene is indicated for the treatment of heterotopic ossification and fibrodysplasia ossificans progressiva.

== History ==
Palovarotene is a retinoic acid receptor gamma (RARγ) agonist licensed to Clementia Pharmaceuticals from Roche Pharmaceuticals. At Roche, palovarotene was evaluated in more than 800 individuals including healthy volunteers and patients with chronic obstructive pulmonary disease (COPD). A one-year trial did not demonstrate a significant benefit on lung density in moderate-to-severe emphysema secondary to severe α(1)-antitrypsin deficiency.

In 2011, animal studies demonstrated that RARγ agonists, including palovarotene, blocked new bone formation in both an injury-induced mouse model of heterotopic ossification (HO) and a genetically modified biological mouse model of fibrodysplasia ossificans progressiva containing a continuously active ACVR1/ALK2 receptor in a dose-dependent manner. A 2016 study demonstrated that palovarotene also inhibited spontaneous heterotopic ossification, maintained limb mobility and functioning, and restored skeletal growth in fibrodysplasia ossificans progressiva mouse models.

== Society and culture ==
=== Legal status ===
Palovarotene is being developed by Ipsen Biopharmaceuticals and was granted priority review and orphan drug designations by the United States Food and Drug Administration (FDA) for the treatment of fibrodysplasia ossificans progressiva and orphan medicinal product designation by the European Medicines Agency (EMA) in 2014. Phase II clinical studies failed to show a significant change in heterotopic bone volume, the main outcome measure, but prompted further investigation in a phase III clinical trial. In December 2022, the FDA declined to approve palovarotene for the fibrodysplasia ossificans progressiva without additional clinical trial data. In January 2023, the European Medicines Agency (EMA) recommended the refusal of the marketing authorization for palovarotene for the treatment of fibrodysplasia ossificans progressiva. In May 2023, the European Medicines Agency confirmed its recommendation to refuse marketing authorization for Sohonos.

== Research ==
=== Phase II ===
Clementia submitted a new drug application for palovarotene for the treatment of fibrodysplasia ossificans progressiva after observing positive phase II results.

=== Phase III ===
In December 2019, Ipsen issued a partial clinical hold for people under the age of 14, due to reports of early fusion of growth plates. Ipsen acquired Clementia in 2019.
