= Progressive osseous heteroplasia =

Rare genetic condition characterised by cutaneous or subcutaneous ossification

- Specialty: Dermatology

Progressive osseous heteroplasia is a cutaneous condition characterized by cutaneous or subcutaneous ossification.

According to the Progressive Osseous Heteroplasia Association:

Progressive Osseous Heteroplasia (POH) is a rare genetic condition in which the body makes extra bone in locations where bone should not form. Extra bone develops inside skin, subcutaneous tissue (fat tissue beneath the skin), muscles, tendons, and ligaments. This ”out of place extra bone formation” is commonly referred to as heterotopic ossification. In people with POH, nodules and lace-like webs of extra bone extend from the skin into the subcutaneous fat and deep connective tissues, and may cross joints. Extra bone formation near the joints may lead to stiffness, locking, and permanent immobility.”

It is associated with GNAS.

A telltale symptom of POH is osteoma cutis under the skin of a newborn. It was discovered in 1994 by physician Frederick Kaplan.

== Diagnosis ==
Patients with POH have a distinctly different manifestation of symptoms than those with fibrodysplasia ossificans progressiva (FOP), though heterotopic ossification appears in both diseases. They lack the congenital abnormality of the big toe that is a diagnostic feature for FOP. People with POH also have ossification of the skin during infancy, which does not occur in FOP. Also, the pattern of ossification differs in POH, spreading in an intramembranous fashion rather than endochondral.

== See also ==
- Fibrodysplasia ossificans progressiva
- Punctate porokeratosis
- List of cutaneous conditions
- Pseudopseudohypoparathyroidism
