= Frederick Kaplan =

American medical researcher

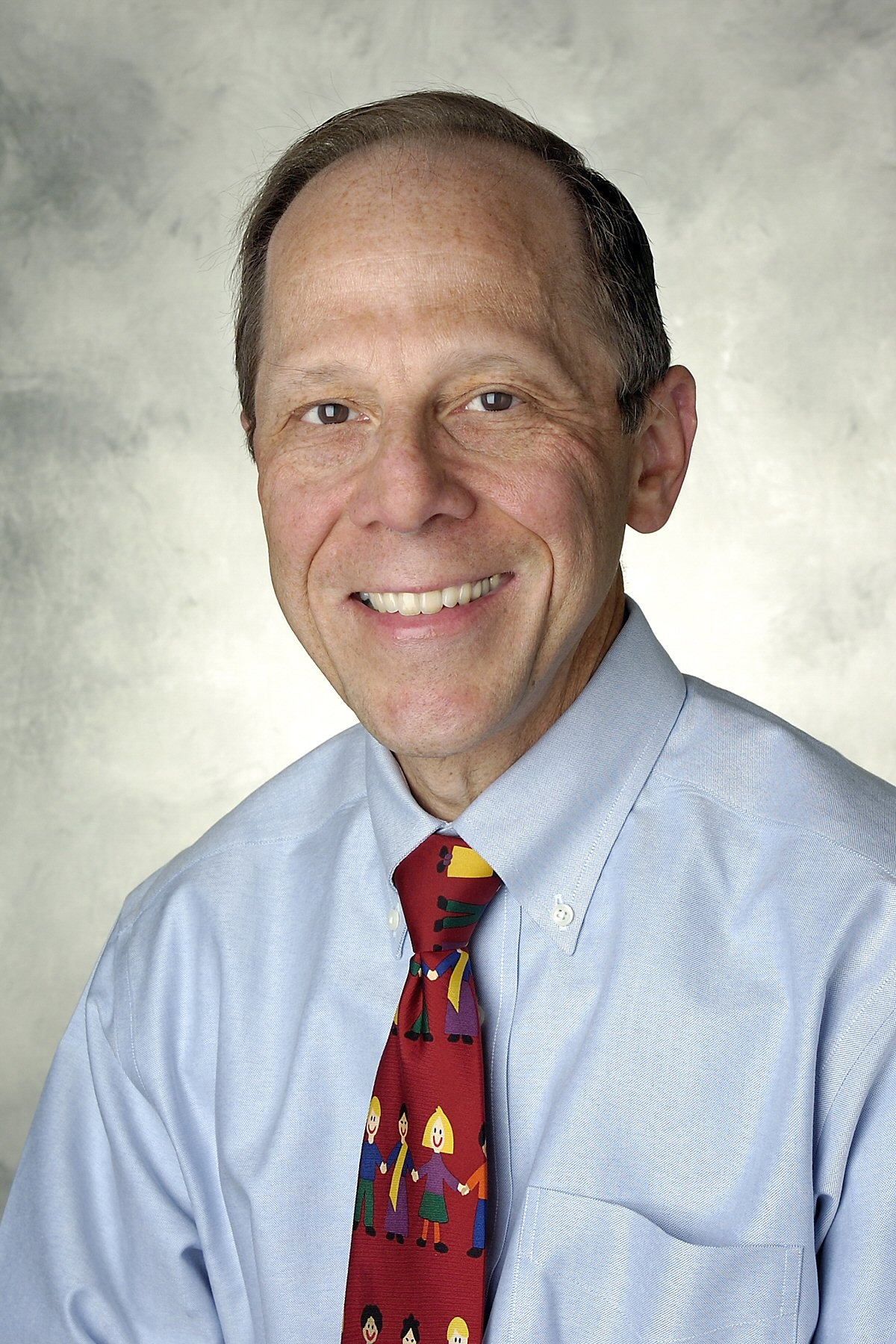
Frederick S. Kaplan

Frederick S. Kaplan is an American medical doctor specializing in research of musculoskeletal disorders such as fibrodysplasia ossificans progressiva (FOP).

== Education ==
Frederick Kaplan received a bachelor's degree from Johns Hopkins University in 1972. He also obtained his Doctor of Medicine (MD) from Johns Hopkins University, graduating in 1976.

== FOP research ==
In the mid 1980s, Kaplan met David Romanoff, the medical director of the Inglis House—a residential care facility for adults with disabilities. Two residents of the facility were diagnosed with fibrodysplasia ossificans progressiva (FOP), a very rare medical condition in which the soft tissue of the body ossifies, or turns to bone, over time. Romanoff was "grappling" with caring for the patients, and asked Kaplan if he would like to meet them, which he did. This was his first encounter with the disease beyond reading about it.

In 1988, Kaplan met immunologist and geneticist Michael Zasloff; Zasloff introduced him to a patient with FOP, a young child. Kaplan stated that his reaction to meeting the young patient was "visceral and immediate", causing him to request a three-year sabbatical from his work so that he could begin to research FOP. Together, Zasloff and Kaplan collaborated to create the FOP Collaborative Research Project at the University of Pennsylvania. In 1992, Kaplan and Eileen Shore initiated the FOP Research Laboratory.

In 2006, Shore and Kaplan discovered the cause of FOP, publishing their findings as "A recurrent mutation in the BMP type I receptor ACVR1 causes inherited and sporadic fibrodysplasia ossificans progressiva". The cause of the disease was traced to a single mutation in the activin A receptor, type I gene. After the discovery, Kaplan remarked, "It took our team of researchers and collaborators more than 15 years of diligent effort to unravel the genetic cause of FOP, which had been shrouded in mystery for so long."

As of 2015, Kaplan and Shore were the directors of the Center for Research in FOP and Related Disorders. They are considered the "world’s foremost experts on FOP".

== POH research ==
In 1994, Kaplan and his colleagues authored a publication describing a new muscoskeletal disorder, progressive osseous heteroplasia (POH). POH was discovered as a distinct condition when Kaplan was investigating FOP. Some of the patients initially diagnosed with FOP were found to have a distinctly different manifestation of symptoms, though, like FOP, the disease still resulted in heterotopic ossification (formation of bone tissue outside the skeleton). None of the patients had congenital abnormalities of the big toe, which is a diagnostic feature for FOP. All of the patients also had ossification of the skin during infancy, which did not occur in FOP. Also, the pattern of ossification was different in these patients, spreading in an intramembranous fashion rather than endochondral.

== Awards and honors ==
In 2006, the magazine Newsweek named Kaplan as one of their "15 People Who Make America Great". In 2009, he was elected to the National Academy of Medicine. In 2017, Kaplan received the Rare Impact Award from the National Organization for Rare Disorders. In 2018, he received the Grand Hamdan International Award - Musculoskeletal Disorders via the Sheikh Hamdan bin Rashid Al Maktoum Award for Medical Sciences for his work in medical sciences.

== See also ==
- Carol Orzel
