= Heterotopic ossification =

Formation of bone tissue outside of the skeleton

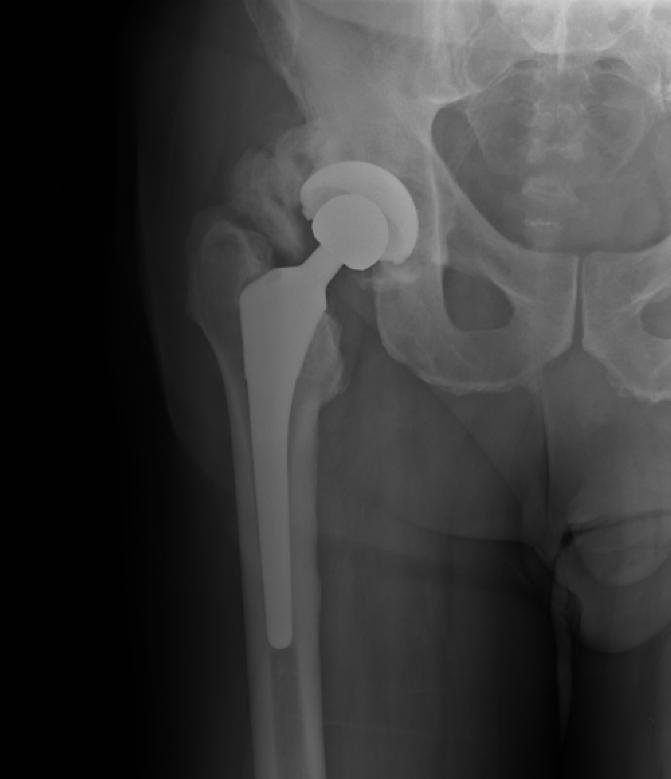
- Specialty: Family Medicine, Physical Medicine & Rehab, Orthopedic Surgeon
- Symptoms: localized pain, decreased range of motion, redness, swelling, warmth
- Risk factors: joint replacement, traumatic brain injury, spinal cord injury, full body burns
- Diagnostic method: bone scan, x-ray, CT scan, ultrasound, MRI
- Treatment: physical therapy, NSAIDs, bisphosphonates, radiation, surgery

Heterotopic ossification (HO) is the abnormal process by which bone tissue forms outside of the skeleton in muscles and soft tissue. It forms following a traumatic injury, neurogenic injury, or genetic predisposition. The likelihood and severity of HO is linked to the severity of the injury. The most common sites of developing HO are the hip, knee, elbow and shoulder. While the exact mechanism of how HO develops is not known, it is believed to be a result of an abnormal muscle repair system, abnormal neurologic healing response below the level of injury, an abnormal inflammatory response, or a combination of them.

Heterotopic ossification presents differently in different stages. In the initial inflammatory stage, there is pain, redness, swelling, warmth, generalized tenderness; this can mimic other more serious medical conditions and should require urgent evaluation. In the late stage, there is more localized pain, decreased range of motion, and underlying tissue damage and complications. There are various blood or urine tests that can be useful in helping predict HO, but there is not one single gold standard lab. Triple bone scan, X-rays and CT scans are the most useful and reliable imaging studies to rule out other similar medical conditions and confirm the diagnosis of HO.

Heterotopic ossification does not have a single treatment to prevent its development or cure its progression. The goal of management should be to control pain, prevent long term complications, and allow the patient to continue to perform their own daily activities of living. This can be achieved through an array of options, ranging from physical therapy to prophylactic radiation and medications to surgical interventions.

== Epidemiology ==
Heterotopic ossification (HO) is a result of one of three initial insults: a traumatic injury, a neurogenic injury, or a genetic predisposition. It is more common in men (3:2 male to female ratio), likely a result of increased muscle mass, increased physical activity, and hormonal signally pathways. It is also more commonly in those that suffer from prolonged intubation, likely from an anoxic brain injury or prolonged immobilization. It is a hard diagnosis to make due to its overlap in symptoms with other common conditions.

In patients that suffered a forearm fracture, 20% of patients will likely develop HO as a complication. In patients that suffered a femoral shaft fracture, that percentage jumps to 52% of patients. However, HO is even more common in military members that suffered combat related injuries. Military patients that suffered any combat related trauma were likely to have HO as a complication 68% of the time; that number increases to 86% if they had a concomitant traumatic brain injury with their orthopedic injury.

Without a specific trauma or inciting event, patients will frequently develop arthritis in major joints (knees, hips and shoulders). This subjects them to eventual surgical treatment or joint replacement. In those patients, their ability to place weight on a joint or move their joint may be limited for a significant period of time. Therefore, this patient population is also subject to developing HO as a surgical complication. It was found that 44% of patients that received either a hip arthroscopy or total hip replacement developed HO.

In patients that develop a lesion or injury to the nerves of their spinal cord, they can develop neurogenic heterotopic ossification. Neurologenic HO effects 20-29% of patients that developed a spinal cord injury (SCI). In an SCI, the spinal level of injury is important to know since complications typically arise distal or below the level of the injury. This is thought to be due to an impaired or abnormal healing response below the injury level. For this reason, the most common sites of HO in the SCI population are the hips and knees.

In patients that develop an injury to their brain, they can also develop neurogenic heterotopic ossification. In traumatic brain injury (TBI) patients, neurogenic HO effects 5-20% of patients, specifically in those that suffered a severe TBI (initial GCS <15). Patients that suffered a TBI due to a blast, commonly military members, have HO as a complication higher than 20% of the time. Similar to SCI patients, TBI patients have HO commonly in sites below the level of neurologic injury. For this reason, the most common sites of HO in the TBI population are the hips, elbows, shoulders, and knees.

In patients that suffer a burn, there are various degrees to the severity of a burn; the depth to the burn and the surface area which the burn covers are two important factors. For HO complications, the surface area is the more influential variable. The likelihood of developing HO as a complication of a burn is between 1-4% if the burn covers at least 30% of the person's body. This complication percentage increases as the burn percentage also increases. For burn patients, the most common site of HO is the elbow, likely due to increased motion at the joint to prevent flexure contractures. The elbow is a clinically significant site to monitor since this specific complication of HO can lead to cubital tunnel syndrome; other common, but less likely, sites are the shoulders, knees, forearms, and temporamandibular joint.

== Presentation of symptoms ==
While heterotopic ossification is not a direct result of a traumatic injury, it also does not have to present with symptoms. In the population that is symptomatic, it commonly follows a standard progression of symptoms.

Following the initial inciting traumatic or neurologic injury, there is a heightened inflammatory response. An abnormal or prolonged inflammatory response can lead to the early stages of HO. Typically within the first 6 to 12 weeks, symptoms will start to arise; this is considered early HO. Here, immature bone forms within the affect joint or tissue, leading to generalized inflammatory symptoms. This manifests as symptoms of redness, warmth, and swelling (37% of patients), pain (35% of patients), or generalized tenderness and decreased range of motion (49% of patients) in the affected joint or tissue. While these symptoms are more annoying than troubling in the context of HO, these symptoms can also be red flag signs for a more serious underlying condition and require medical evaluation.

As time continues, symptoms will typically progress from a more generalized inflammatory response to a localized pain center. This presents as localized tenderness, pain, and painful or decreased range of motion in the tissue or joint affected. This is considered late HO. In all stages, if the abnormal bone formation grows to imping on surrounding structures, complications can arise depending on the structure involved. This can lead to nerve compression, vascular compression, pressure sores, lymphedema, ankylosis and present as pain, numbness, tingling, weakness, swelling, spasticity, decreased range of motion. Presentation of physical exam symptoms will depend on the location and severity of the HO.

== Diagnosis ==
Since heterotopic ossification can present similar to other more serious pathologies, a physical exam alone may not confirm the diagnosis. Utilizing laboratory testing and medical imaging together can provide a better picture to rule out more serious conditions and correctly identify the stage and severity of HO.

=== Labs ===
Before treatment can begin for heterotopic ossification, more serious conditions must be ruled out. Lab work may begin with a routine complete blood count and comprehensive metabolic panel to monitor blood, immune system, and organ function. With serious conditions ruled out, more specific labs may be ordered to assist in diagnosing the severity and progression of HO. Since HO is an abnormal growth of bone outside the skeletal system, it is theorized that calcium, a major mineral of bones, may be abnormal during different stages of HO. However, tracking calcium is not a reliable method as calcium is strictly hormonally regulated in the body and will not be elevated in HO. Alkaline phosphatase is an enzyme whose activity is linked to bone growth and has been found to be elevated in HO; however, it is not statistically significant in identifying HO alone. However, it was found that in HO patients, alkaline phosphatase was elevated 2 weeks following their initial injury, peaked at 10 weeks post-injury, and returned to baseline by the 18 week post-injury mark. Osteocalcin is a hormone produced during bone turnover that is neither sensitive nor specific for HO and cannot accurately predict its occurrence. Understanding that HO is theorized to be a result of increased inflammation, blood inflammatory markers such as C-reactive protein (CRP) and erythrocyte sedimentation rate (ESR) can identify a body's inflammatory state; however, this is not a sensitive marker for HO. While it is not specific to HO, it was found that 12 weeks after a total hip replacement, an ESR above 35mm/hr was a reliable predictor for developing severe HO in patients. Similarly, elevation in creatine kinase (CK) was found to be associated with more aggressive forms of HO. CK is an enzyme found in muscle tissue that, when found in the blood, can lead to believe there is active muscle damage.

In addition to blood work, a urinalysis can identify certain byproducts of HO that a clinician may use to rule in or rule out its diagnosis. A 24-hour urine measurement for hydroxyproline can detect if one is building and breaking down bone at an increased rate compared to normal; however, this is not considered to be a reliable method to detect HO. Contrasting, a 24-hour urine lab test can reveal elevated levels of prostaglandin E2 in the early stage of HO and will warrant a triple bone scan for further workup. While prostaglandin E2 is not specific for HO and is more associated with inflammatory conditions, its elevation has been associated with early HO.

Genetic testing can be performed to confirm or rule-out either Fibrodysplasia ossificans progressiva (FOP), which is caused by a mutation in the ACVR1 gene, or Progressive osseous heteroplasia (POH), which is caused by a mutational spectrum in the GNAS-1 gene. In addition, a research paper published on the American Journal of Medical Genetics in May 2023 described a case where heterotopic ossification was associated with genetic variants of unknown significance in PDLIM-7, "...the gene encoding LMP-1 (LIM Mineralization Protein-1), an intracellular protein involved in the bone morphogenetic protein (BMP) pathway signaling and ossification."

=== Imaging ===
X-ray of heterotopic ossification of the elbow, after comminuted fracture and arthroplasty.

While laboratory studies are not reliable for diagnosing heterotopic ossification, medical imaging studies are more sensitive and specific for accurately diagnosing HO. Although it may be the simplest, most inexpensive method, an x-ray will not be helpful during the early stage. The only definitive diagnostic test in the early stage is a bone scan, which will show heterotopic ossification as early as 2.5 weeks post-injury, which is over 2 weeks sooner than detected by x-ray. While a bone scan is more specific less than one month post-injury, its use will be dependent on when symptoms begin. If symptoms arise after 4 weeks post-injury, and if the treatment team wants to rule out more serious complications, the team may begin with radiography or a CT scan. Their low cost and ability to detect immature bone formation while also checking for other diagnosis make them a useful tool to aid in the diagnosis. A treatment team may also utilize other imaging techniques such as an ultrasound or MRI to aid in the diagnosis process, more commonly used to rule out more serious, similarly presenting underlying conditions.

When the initial presentation is swelling and increased temperature in a leg, thrombophlebitis or a deep vein clot cannot be ruled out with a clinical exam alone; therefore, ultrasound imaging may be necessary to differentiate. Similarly, osteomyelitis and malignant soft tissue masses can present similarly to HO; in this case, MRI has been found helpful in correctly diagnosis HO.

== Classification types ==
Once heterotopic ossification has been diagnosed via imaging, the next step is assessing its severity and monitoring for progression of symptoms. There have been several classification systems identified, each dependent on the joint affected.

The Brooker Classification System is utilized following total hip replacement to grade HO formation.

Brooker Classification System
Classification	Description
Class 1	Island of bone within the soft tissue around the hip
Class 2	Bone spurs on the hip or proximal femur, where the distance between the spurs is > 1 cm
Class 3	Bone spurs on the hip or proximal femur, where the distance between the spurs is < 1 cm
Class 4	Boney fusion of the hip and proximal femur

The Hastings and Graham Classification System is utilized to grade HO formation at the elbow and forearm.

Hastings and Graham Classification System
Classification	Description
Category 1	Asymptomatic (no functional limitations), HO present on radiographs
Category 2	Symptomatic (functional limitations), HO present on radiography
Category 2A	limitations in elbow flexion/extension
Category 2B	limitations in forearm pronation/supination
Category 2B	limitations in elbow flexion/extension AND forearm pronation/supination
Category 3	Symptomatic (functional limitations), complete boney fusion of the joint on radiograph

== Management ==
=== Physical therapy / passive range of motion ===
Conservative treatments such as passive range of motion exercises or other mobilization techniques provided by physical therapists or occupational therapists may also assist in preventing HO. For managing heterotopic ossification, there are mixed reviews in the literature about the success and efficacy of physical therapy (PT) and passive range of motion (PROM). In patients that had a total knee replacement, PT and PROM was found to be beneficial in preventing HO three months after surgery. PT was also the superior choice of management to prevent HO in those patients that had a total hip replacement. Patients that suffered a burn injury are encouraged to maintain range of motion in their effected joint to prevent flexure contractures; in these cases, PROM actually increased the likelihood of HO in these patients. In those with a neurologic injury (SCI or TBI), PROM alone did not prevent HO, but its utilization with other treatment modalities was found to prevent contractures and maintain mobility. In TBI patients that had HO of a joint, it was found that PROM of the joint did not worsen progression of HO; it was also found that when spasticity was not affecting the muscles of the affected joint, PROM under anesthesia improved joint motion. A review article looked at 114 adult patients retrospectively and suggested that the lower incidence of HO in patients with a very severe TBI may have been due to early intensive physical and occupational therapy in conjunction with pharmacological treatment. Another review article also recommended physiotherapy as an adjunct to pharmacological and medical treatments because passive range of motion exercises may maintain range at the joint and prevent secondary soft tissue contractures, which are often associated with joint immobility.

=== Medications ===
==== NSAIDs ====
It has often been believed that the use of non-steroidal anti-inflammatory drugs (NSAIDs), specifically indomethacin, will prevent complete fracture healing. However, indomethacin and ibuprofen have shown some effect in preventing recurrence of heterotopic ossification after total hip replacement or spinal cord injury. Therefore, balancing the risk of nonunion and benefits of preventing HO is the skill of NSAID utilization. While indomethacin is the mainstay of NSAID treatment for preventing HO, the FDA does not indicate its use. Indomethacin has been used in early and intermediate stages of HO to limit its formation and progression; indomethacin compared to placebo reduced late HO at a statistically significantly rate. Similar results were found in patients treated with rofecoxib and patients did not report significant side effects. In patients at high-risk for HO following hip surgery, both standardized indomethacin treatment and selective COX-2 inhibitor NSAIDs were found to be equally efficacious as a single dose of radiation to the hip. In SCI patients, NSAIDs were found to be beneficial in preventing HO and had the greatest efficacy when administered early after the incident. When comparing SCI patients, prophylactic NSAIDs compared to placebo showed statistically significant lowered incidence of HO in the prophylactic patient population.

==== Bisphosphonates ====
Bisphosphonates are the FDA approved medication for prevention and treatment of heterotopic ossification; they work by preventing bone growth in joints and soft tissues. While it is FDA approved for HO, the literature has mixed perspectives on its efficacy. Some research has shown that there is not a clear benefit compared to placebo in preventing HO and that it can delay the symptom onset or could even worsen the HO formation. There is also the risk of delaying bone healing following orthopedic surgery. In addition, there was not statistically significant findings compared to placebo in SCI patients to warrant the use of bisphosphonates as a prophylactic medication. In contrast, other studies found that bisphosphonates were the most effective maintenance therapy, especially in SCI and burn patients. However, in this study, it was theorized that first generation bisphosphonates are more efficacious than subsequent generations due to the subsequent generations underlying mechanism of action affection only bone breakdown and not inhibiting abnormal bone formation.

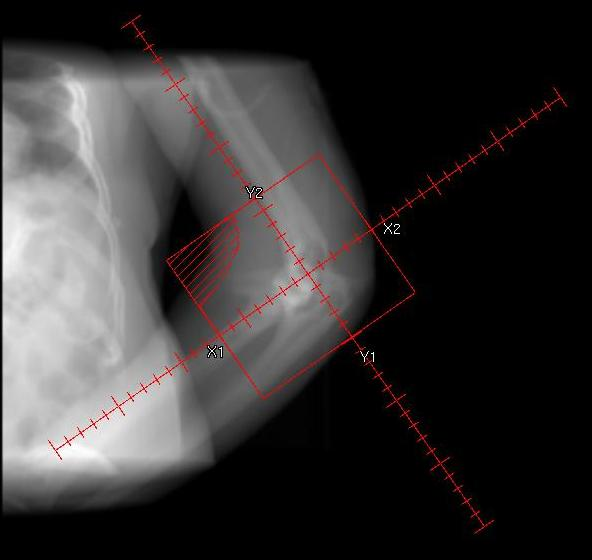
Elbow heterotopic ossification radiation therapy field, status post surgery.

=== Radiation therapy ===
Prophylactic radiation therapy for the prevention of heterotopic ossification has been employed since the 1970s. A variety of doses and techniques have been used. However, higher doses of radiation have not shown statistically significant increase in benefit compared to lower doses of radiation; in fact, higher doses accompany the risk of worsening side effects. Generally, radiation therapy should be delivered as close as practical to the time of surgery. A dose of 7-8 Gray in a single fraction within 24–48 hours of surgery has been used successfully. It was found that a single postoperative prophylactic dose of 700 cGy radiation compared to 400 cGy radiation decreased the incidence of HO from 42% to 25% in total hip replacement patients. Treatment volumes include the peri-articular region, and can be used for hip, knee, elbow, shoulder, jaw or in patients after spinal cord trauma.

Single dose radiation therapy is well tolerated and is cost effective, without an increase in bleeding, infection or wound healing disturbances.

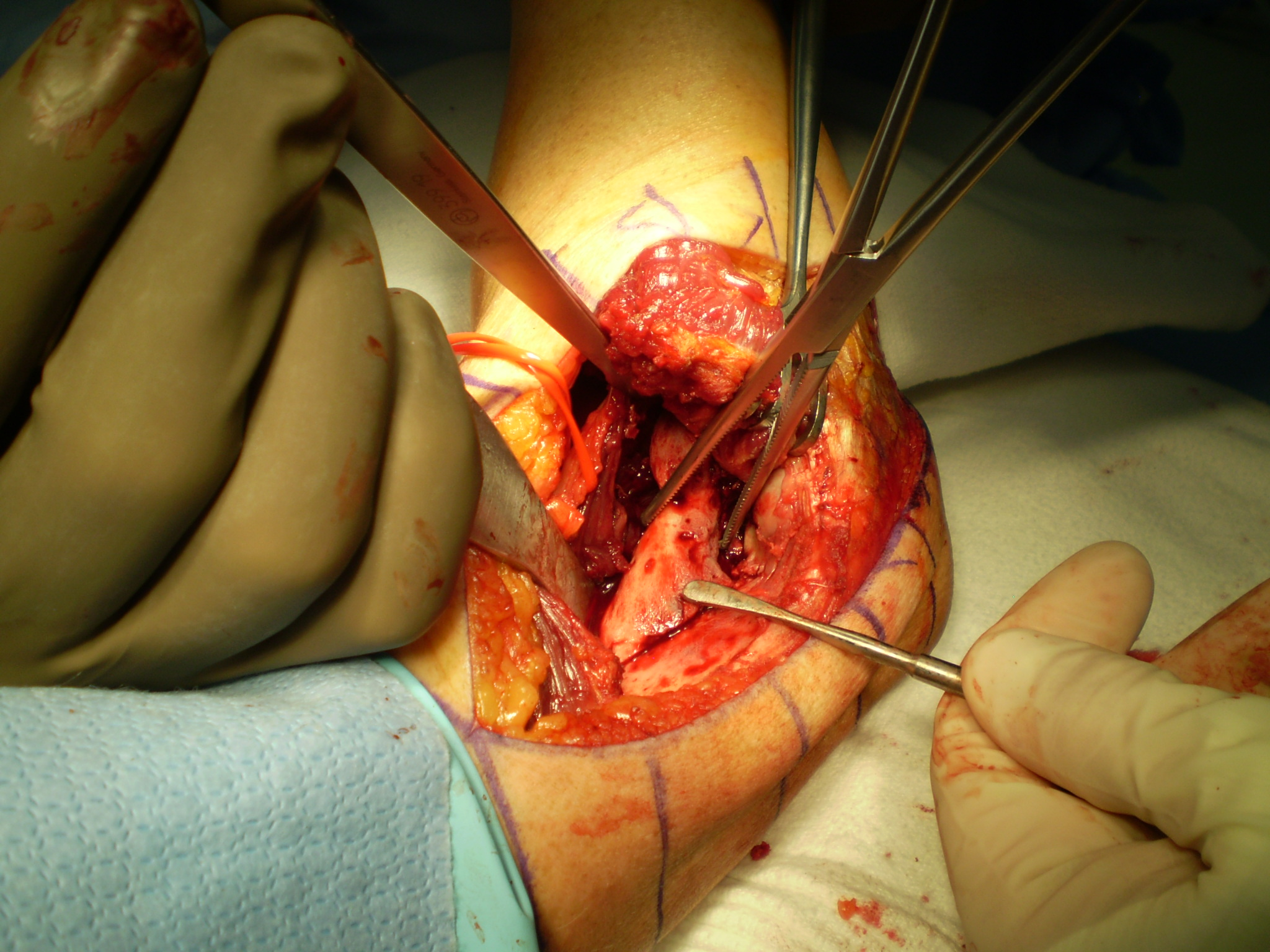
Surgical removal of a heterotopic ossification fusing the right humerus and radius following a severe TBI and complete fracture of the ulna.

=== Surgery ===
The only curative treatment is surgical resection when possible depending on location and size of the heterotopic ossification. However recurrence may occur with rates between 2% and 31% depending on the report. Specific to the TBI population, surgical removal of the abnormal bone was the most effective treatment strategy. Additional treatment with bisphosphonate (etidronate) or indomethacin after resection surgery do not significantly reduce the rate of recurrence.

== Patho-mechanism ==
The underlying mechanism by which heterotopic ossification forms is not fully understood but has been studied in a mouse model of neurogenic heterotopic ossification. In this model, heterotopic ossifications develop after an injury to the central nervous system such as the spinal cord and muscle, with bone developing exclusively in injured muscles. HO is thought to be caused by abnormal muscle repair. During normal muscle repair, muscle stem cells divide and differentiate to regenerate muscle fibres. This process is controlled by inflammatory cells and support muscle cell growth. A key step during normal muscle repair is the programmed cell death (apoptosis) triggered inflammatory cells to prevent the development of muscle fibrosis. However, following a spinal cord injury, fibro-adipogenic progenitors fail to undergo apoptosis and instead accumulate and differentiate into bone forming osteoblasts. The spinal cord injury stimulates the adrenal glands to release the glucocorticoid corticosterone into the circulation. Excessive corticosterone causes an exaggerated inflammation response in the injured muscle with excessive release of oncostatin M and interleukin-1β. Oncostatin M and interleukin-1 bind to their cognate receptors OSMR and IL1R1 expressed by muscle fibro-adipogenic progenitors which in turn promote their proliferation and osteogenic differentiation. In support of this model, treatment with glucocorticoid receptor antagonists such as mifepristone or relacorilant or conditional deletion of the glucocorticoid receptor gene strongly inhibit the development of neurogenic heterotopic ossification after spinal cord injury in this mouse model. Treatment with ruxolitinib, an inhibitor of JAK1 and JAK2 tyrosine kinases, which are activated downstream of OSMR, also reduces neurogenic heterotopic ossification in this model. This mechanism also explains why infections, particularly with gram-negative bacteria, are associated with higher prevalence of neurogenic heterotopic ossifications in victims of traumatic brain and spinal cord injuries. Lipopolysaccharides from gram-negative bacteria worsen heterotopic ossification by binding to their receptor Toll-like receptor 4 expressed by macrophages and muscle fibro-adipogenic progenitors and further increase oncostatin M and interleukin-1β release by macrophages. Additional pathogen-associated molecular patterns produced by bacteria and viruses such as lipopeptides and double stranded RNA have been found to exacerbate neurogenic HO development after spinal cord injury.

There are also rare genetic disorders causing heterotopic ossification such as fibrodysplasia ossificans progressiva (FOP), a condition that causes injured bodily tissues to be replaced by heterotopic bone. Characteristically exhibiting in the big toe at birth, it causes the formation of heterotopic bone throughout the body over the course of the sufferer's life, causing chronic pain and eventually leading to the immobilisation and fusion of most of the skeleton by abnormal growths of bone.

Another rare genetic disorder causing heterotopic ossification is progressive osseous heteroplasia, is a condition characterized by cutaneous or subcutaneous ossification.

== See also ==
- Intramembranous ossification
- Myositis ossificans
- Fibrodysplasia ossificans progressiva
- Progressive osseous heteroplasia
