= Harold Saxton Burr =

American medical researcher and painter

- H.S. Burr
- Born: April 18, 1889; Lowell, Massachusetts
- Died: February 17, 1973
- Scientific career
- Fields: Neuroanatomy and bioelectrodynamics
- Doctoral advisor: Ross Granville Harrison
- Doctoral students: Robert Richardson Sears

Harold Saxton Burr (April 18, 1889 – February 17, 1973) was E. K. Hunt Professor of Anatomy at Yale University School of Medicine and researcher into bio-electrics.

== Early life ==
He was born in Lowell, Massachusetts in 1889, to parents Hanford Burr and Clara Saxton. He studied in public schools and at the Technical High School in Springfield, Massachusetts. In 1908 he was admitted to the Sheffield Scientific School at Yale and received his Ph.B. in 1911. On December 27 of that year, in Chicago, he married Jean Chandler, with whom he had a son, Peter. In 1914 he was appointed Instructor in Anatomy at Yale. He studied for his Ph.D. under Ross Granville Harrison, which he received in 1915. He was a teacher at Yale until 1958, becoming an assistant professor in 1919, an associate professor in 1926, and a Professor in 1929. Most of his later life was spent in New Haven.

== Academic career ==
From 1916 to 1956, Burr published, either alone or with others, ninety-three scientific papers. Early studies mostly focused upon the development of the meninges and other neural bodies, often studying the amblystoma or larval salamander.

In 1932, his observations of neuro-cellular proliferation in the amblystoma led him to propose "An Electro-Dynamic Theory of Development" for which he is now most widely remembered. In 1935 he published (with F. S. C. Northrop) "The Electro-Dynamic Theory of Life" and (with C. T. Lane) "Electrical Characteristics of Living Systems". Burr is noted for his use of the voltmeter to detect the electric potential of the body, first reported upon in his 1936 paper (with C. T. Lane and L. F. Nims) "A Vacuum Tube Micro-voltmeter for the Measurement of Bio-electric Phenomena". Burr proposed the term "L-Field" for the bio-electric fields of living systems.

In 1942, Burr measured the output of electric current by growing corn and reported "electricity seems to bridge the gap between the lifeless world and living matter... electricity is one of the fundamental factors in all living systems just as it is in the non-living world."

Burr's research contributed to the electrical detection of cancer cells, experimental embryology, neuroanatomy, and the regeneration and development of the nervous system. His studies of the bio-electrics of ovulation and menstruation eventually led to the marketing of fertility-indicating devices. His late studies of the electrodynamics of trees, carried out over decades, suggested entrainment to diurnal, lunar and annual cycles. He also contributed a few papers on the history and sociology of his field.

Burr's book, The Nature of Man and the Meaning of Existence (1962) was an attack against materialist philosophy. In the book Burr wrote there is order in the universe, unity in the organism and man is endowed with a soul. His book Blueprint for Immortality, published late in his career though he based it upon work carried out over decades, contended that the electro-dynamic fields of all living things, which may be measured and mapped with standard voltmeters, mold and control each organism's development, health, and mood. He named these fields fields of life or L-Fields.

Burr compared the L-field to the entelechy of Hans Driesch and the morphogenetic field of Hans Spemann and Paul Weiss. Burr used the L-field to explain cellular differentiation and the form of living organisms. According to writer Ruby Khoo in the New Straits Times, Burr's theory has been rejected by "most scientists." Burr's research was continued by Leonard J. Ravitz, a physician who had worked with Burr at Yale. Ravitz has written that ovulation, illness, cuts and scratches can affect readings of the L-field.

== Personal life ==
Burr was a keen amateur painter of waterscapes and landscapes. His early work shows the influence of his friend George Bruestle while his later paintings, now often in pastel rather than oil, became more abstract in design. He exhibited at the Lyme Art Association from 1926 to 1946 and at the New Haven Paint and Clay Club from 1930 to 1946.

== Selected publications ==
- — (1932). An Electro-Dynamic Theory of Development Suggested by Studies of Proliferation Rates in the Brain of Amblystoma. Journal of Comparative Neurology 56: 347–371.
- —; Northrop, F. S. C. (1935). The Electro-Dynamic Theory of Life. Quarterly Review of Biology 10: 322–333.
- —; Lane, C. T. (1935). Electrical Characteristics of Living Systems. Yale Journal of Biology and Medicine 8: 31-35
- —; Lane, C. T; Nims, L. F. (1936). A Vacuum Tube Micro-voltmeter for the Measurement of Bio-electric Phenomena. Yale Journal of Biology and Medicine 10: 65–76.
- —; Hovland, C. I. (1937). Bio-Electric Potential Gradients in the Chick. Yale Journal of Biology and Medicine 9: 247–258.
- —; Northrop, F. S. C. (1939). Evidence for the Existence of an Electro-Dynamic Field in Living Organisms. Proceedings National Academy of Science 25: 284–288.
- — (1947). Field Theory in Biology. The Scientific Monthly 64: 217–225.
- — The Nature of Man and the Meaning of Existence. (1962). Thomas.
- — Blueprint for Immortality. (1972). Neville Spearman.
- — The Fields of Life. Our Links with the Universe. (1973). Ballantine Books.

== See also ==
- List of neuroscientists
- Electroencephalography
- Electrocardiogram
- Electrotherapy
- Bioenergetics
- Aura
- Walter John Kilner
- Kirlian Photography
- Morphogenetic field of biologist Rupert Sheldrake
- Orgone energy of Wilhelm Reich
- Prana in Ayurveda and Yoga
- Qi or ch'i or ki in several Asian cultures, especially Chinese
- Vitalism
