= Deaver =

Deaver is a surname. Notable people with the surname include:

- Affadilla Deaver (1808–1876), conductor on the Underground Railroad
- Bascom S. Deaver (born 1930), American physicist
- Bascom Sine Deaver (1882–1944), American judge
- Jeffery Deaver (born 1950), American writer
- John Blair Deaver (1855-1931), American surgeon
- Michael Deaver (1938–2007), advisor to Ronald Reagan
- Philip F. Deaver (1946–2018), American writer
- Richard Deaver (born 1931), American sailor

== See also ==
- Deaver, Wyoming, town in Wyoming, United States
