= Jane M. Oppenheimer =

American embryologist and historian

- Born: September 19, 1911; Philadelphia, Pa., U.S.
- Died: March 19, 1996 (aged 84)
- Education: Bryn Mawr College (A.B. 1932) Yale University (Ph.D 1935)
- Scientific career
- Fields: Embryology and History of Science
- Workplaces: Bryn Mawr College (1938-1980)
- Doctoral advisor: John Spangler Nicholas

Jane Marion Oppenheimer (1911–1996) was an American embryologist and historian of science.

== Early life, interests, and education ==
Oppenheimer was born in Philadelphia, the only child of James H. Oppenheimer and Sylvia Stern. Her father, a physician, encouraged physical activity: sports at school and a personalized exercise regimen at home. She was tutored in French and piano, and developed a love of classical music, fine food, and travel. Oppenheimer's interests in Art were eclectic. The collection she donated to Bryn Mawr includes jade, ivory, and bronze objects, landscape watercolors, and etchings by Pablo Picasso, Jacques Villon, Auguste Rodin, and Leonard Baskin.

Oppenheimer graduated from Bryn Mawr College (1932) and earned a Ph.D. in Zoology from Yale University (1935). She met John Spangler Nicholas as an undergraduate attending summer classes at the Woods Hole Marine Biological Laboratory. She later studied under Nicholas at Yale, where she was also influenced by Ross Granville Harrison. Oppenheimer used Nicholas's method of dechorionating embryos of the killifish, Fundulus heteroclitus, which allowed her to perform precise manipulations of teleost embryos.

== Teaching ==
In 1937, Oppenheimer served as a Research Fellow at University of Rochester. In 1938, "Miss Op" joined the faculty of Bryn Mawr as a biologist. Beginning in the early 1940s, Oppenheimer and geology professor Dorothy Wyckoff began teaching courses on the history of science. In the 1970s, Oppenheimer was instrumental in developing a cooperative graduate program in the history of science involving Bryn Mawr, the University of Pennsylvania, and the American Philosophical Society; the program lapsed after her retirement.

Oppenheimer retired in 1980 as the William R. Kenan Jr. Professor of Biology and History of Science, but returned to Bryn Mawr as a visiting professor from 1983 to 1984. She also taught at the New School for Social Research, Johns Hopkins, the University of Paris, Hadassah Medical School, and Northwestern University as a visiting professor.

== Embryology ==
Oppenheimer's experimental career grew from her graduate work with Fundulus heteroclitus, and she made significant contributions to teleost embryology. She was particularly interested in questions of inductions, differentiation capabilities, and regulation. Seven early papers were based upon grafting experiments and demonstrated that the dorsal lips of fish and amphibian embryos showed the same organizer activity. Oppenheimer also performed fate mapping experiments, described cell movements of gastrulation, and published a staging series for Fundulus embryos.

Oppenheimer designed one of the four American experiments performed in the 1975 Apollo-Soyuz mission. The experiment analyzed the effects of weightlessness on Fundulus embryos at different stages of development.

== History of science ==
Oppenheimer's work in the field included Essays in the History of Embryology and Biology (1967), which focused largely on the nineteenth and early twentieth centuries, but ventured as far back as the sixteenth. She also wrote biographical studies of Karl E. von Baer, Curt Herbst, and Ross Harrison. Her areas of particular interest included the relationship of embryological data to evolutionary theory and early physiological and surgical discoveries.

== Editing ==
As editor or member of the editorial board, Oppenheimer was involved with American Zoologist, Biological Abstracts, Excerpta Medica, Journal of Morphology, Journal of the History of Biology, and Quarterly Review of Biology.

== Awards and honors ==
Oppenheimer was awarded the Wilbur Lucius Cross Medal (Yale Graduate Alumni Association), Otto H. Hafner Award (American Association of the History of Medicine and the Medical Library Association), Kosmos Achievement Award (U.S.S.R.), Lindback Award for Distinguished Teaching, NASA Group Achievement Award, Karl Ernst von Baer Medal (Estonian Academy of Sciences), and an honorary doctorate from Brown University. She won Fellowships from the Guggenheim (twice), National Science Foundation, and Rockefeller Foundation. She was elected a member of the American Philosophical Society and served as secretary from 1987 to 1992, and of the American Academy of Arts and Letters. She was president of the American Society of Zoologists in 1973 and a Fellow of the American Association for the Advancement of Science.

Oppenheimer belonged to many scholarly societies, including the American Association of Anatomists, the American Society of Naturalists, the International Society for Developmental Biology, the American Society for Developmental Biology, the American Association of the History of Medicine, the History of Science Society, the International Academy of the History of Science, the International Society for the History of Medicine, the International Academy of the History of Medicine (Paris), and the College of Physicians of Philadelphia.
