= Benjamin Duffield =

Benjamin Duffield may refer to:

- Benjamin Duffield (physician)
- Benjamin Duffield (film editor)
