= Domenico Praticò =

Neuropathologist

Domenico Praticò M.D.
- Education: Sapienza University of Rome (MD)
- Scientific career
- Fields: Alzheimer's disease, Dementia, Neurodegeneration brain health
- Workplaces: PraticoLab Philadelphia
- Website: www.drdomenicopratico.com

Domenico Praticò is a neuropathologist, professor, and doctor who is an international expert on Brain health, Alzheimer's disease, Dementia, neurodegenerative diseases, and aging. Since 2020, his work, however, came under scrutiny and since 2024 several of his paper were retracted.

== Biography ==
Praticò is the former Scott Richards North Star Charitable Foundation Chair for Alzheimer's Research and Director of the Alzheimer's Center at Temple University's Lewis Katz School of Medicine in Philadelphia, Pennsylvania.

He received his MD from the University of Rome "La Sapienza" and previously taught at the University of Pennsylvania's Perelman School of Medicine. He is also a fellow of the College of Physicians of Philadelphia.

== Research ==
Praticò's most recent research focuses on the effect extra-virgin olive oil (EVOO) has on the brain, particularly related to the buildup and prevention of toxic tau proteins, a key factor in Alzheimer's disease. He demonstrated that a diet rich in EVOO can help prevent the mental decline associated with Alzheimer's and other dementias.

Praticò's other research focuses on bioactive oxidized lipids, where his work "has significantly contributed to the current understanding of their importance as biomarkers, mediators of cellular and molecular events involved in the pathogenesis of several clinical conditions, and therapeutic targets for preventing and treating human diseases."

== Controversies ==
In 2020, a letter from Temple colleagues urging the university to investigate his work was obtained by The Inquirer. Since 2024, ten of his papers have been retracted, mostly for image manipulation and unreliable data, leading to the questioning of the validity of his work. The problematic nature of D. Praticò's research is one of many cases that submerged recently regarding Alzheimer research.
