= George Bacon Wood =

American physician (1797–1879)

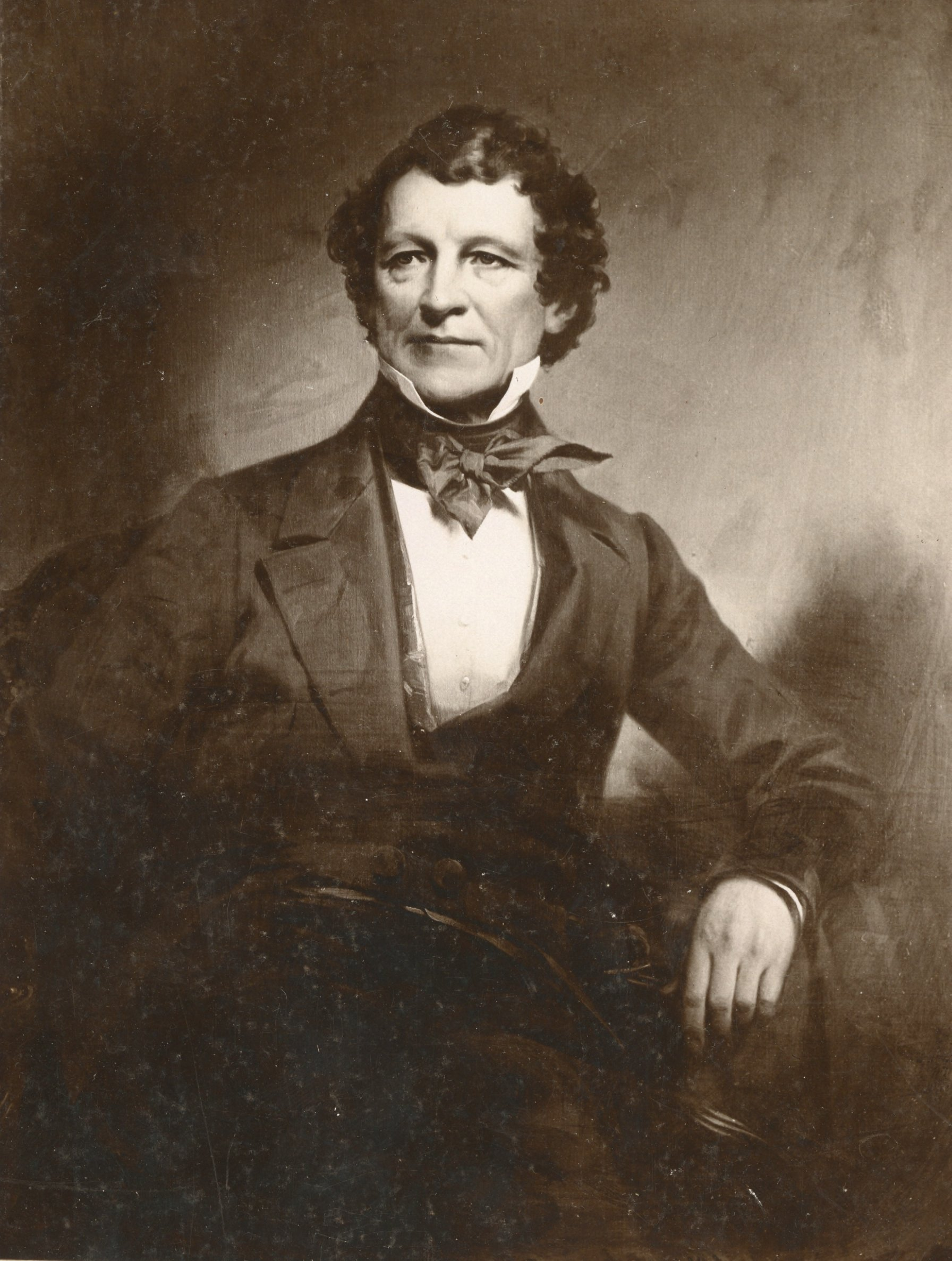
- Born: March 13, 1797; Greenwich, New Jersey, U.S.
- Died: March 30, 1879 (aged 82); Philadelphia, Pennsylvania, U.S.
- Resting place: Laurel Hill Cemetery, Philadelphia, Pennsylvania, U.S.
- Education: University of Pennsylvania (BA, 1815) University of Pennsylvania School of Medicine (MD, 1818)
- Occupations: Physician professor writer
- Known for: Chair of Materia Medica at the Univ. of Penn. School of Medicine; Compiled first Dispensatory of the United States (1833); president of both the College of Physicians of Philadelphia and American Medical Association
- Spouse: Caroline Hahn (m. 1823; died 1865)
- Relatives: Horatio C Wood (nephew)
- Medical career
- Institutions: Philadelphia College of Pharmacy; University of Pennsylvania School of Medicine; Pennsylvania Hospital; University of Pennsylvania; College of Physicians of Philadelphia; American Medical Association

George Bacon Wood (March 13, 1797 – March 30, 1879) was an American medical doctor, chemist, professor, and writer. He was chair of chemistry and materia medica at the Philadelphia College of Pharmacy. He served as chair of materia medica, as well as chair and professor emeritus of theory and practice of medicine at the University of Pennsylvania. He published frequently and is best known for the Dispensatory of the United States with Dr. Franklin Bache, A Treatise on the Practice of Medicine, and A Treatise on Therapeutics and Pharmacology of Materia Medica.

He served as a trustee at the University of Pennsylvania and funded an endowment to create an auxiliary faculty for five chairs of medicine. He worked as a physician at the Pennsylvania Institute for the Deaf and Dumb from 1822 to 1844 and Pennsylvania Hospital from 1835 to 1844. He served as a trustee of Girard College and as president of the American Medical Association, the College of Physicians of Philadelphia, and the American Philosophical Society.

== Early life and education ==
Wood was born on March 13, 1797, in Greenwich, New Jersey to Richard Wood and Elizabeth Bacon. His parents were Quaker farmers. He studied in New York City under John Griscom and received his A.B. degree in 1815 and his M.D. in 1818 from the University of Pennsylvania.

== Career ==
He was professor of chemistry at the Philadelphia College of Pharmacy, and in 1822 accepted the chair of chemistry. He served in that role until 1831 until it was changed to the chair of materia medica. He resigned in 1835 to accept the same role in the medical department of the University of Pennsylvania. In 1850, he was elected chair of the theory and practice of medicine to replace Nathaniel Chapman. In 1860, he was unanimously appointed emeritus professor of the theory and practice of medicine and was succeeded in the chair by William Pepper. He served as a trustee of the university from 1863 to 1879, and in 1865 endowed an auxiliary faculty with five chairs of medicine focused on botany, hygiene, medical jurisprudence and toxicology, mineralogy, and zoology and comparative medicine. He served as a trustee of Girard College from 1833 to 1841.

He worked as a physician at the Pennsylvania Institute for the Deaf and Dumb from 1822 to 1844 and the Pennsylvania Hospital from 1835 to 1844. He served as president of the College of Physicians of Philadelphia and of the American Philosophical Society (elected in 1829). He was a member of a number of other societies, and served as president of the American Medical Association from 1855 to 1856.

Wood contributed frequently to medical literature, but he is best known for his A Treatise on the Practice of Medicine, published in 1847, which ran through six editions, the last being in 1867. He also compiled with Dr. Franklin Bache, the Dispensatory of the United States, which first appeared in 1833. He also wrote A Treatise on Therapeutics and Pharmacology of Materia Medica in 1847. He gave a number of addresses, including a History of the Pennsylvania Hospital and a History of the University of Pennsylvania.

During the last four years of his life he was invalid and confined to his house, the last two years in his bed. He died on March 30, 1879, in Philadelphia and was interred in Section 10, Lot 14 to 17, of Laurel Hill Cemetery.

== Personal life ==
He married Caroline Hahn on April 2, 1823. They had no children and she died in 1865. Wood's nephew Horatio C. Wood Jr. also became a noted physician.

== Publications ==
- The History of the University of Pennsylvania, From Its Origin to the Year 1827, Philadelphia: McCarty & Davis, 1834
- The Dispensatory of the United States of America, Philadelphia: Grigg & Elliot, 1839
- A Memoir of the Life and Character of the Late Joseph Parrish, M.D. Read Before the Medical Society of Philadelphia, October 23d, 1840., Philadelphia: Lydia R. Bailey, Printer, 1840
- An Address on the Occasion of the Centennial Celebration of the Founding of the Pennsylvania Hospital, Delivered June 10th, 1851, Philadelphia: T.K. and P.G. Collins, 1851
- A Biographical Memoir of Samuel George Morton, M.D., Philadelphia: T.K. and P.G. Collins, 1853
- A Treatise on the Practice of Medicine in Two Volumes - Vol. I., Philadelphia: Lippincott, Grambo, and Co, 1855
- A Treatise on the Practice of Medicine in Two Volumes - Vol. II., Philadelphia: Lippincott, Grambo, and Co, 1855
- A Treatise on Therapeutics, and Pharmacology of Materia Medica. In Two Volumes. Vol. I., Philadelphia: Lippincott, Grambo, and Co., 1855
- A Treatise on Therapeutics, and Pharmacology of Materia Medica. In Two Volumes. Vol. II., Philadelphia: J.B. Lippincott and Co., 1856
- Proceedings on the Occasion of Laying the Corner Stone of the New Pennsylvania Hospital for the Insane, at Philadelphia., Philadelphia: T.K. and P.G. Collins, 1856
- Introductory to the Course of Lectures on the Theory and Practice of Medicine, in the University of Pennsylvania, Philadelphia: Collins Printers, 1858
- Introductory Lectures and Addresses on Medical Subjects Delivered Chiefly Before the Medical Classes of the University of Pennsylvania., Philadelphia: J.B. Lippincott & Co., 1859
- Biographical Memoir of the Late Franklin Bache, M. D., Prepared at the Request of the American Philosophical Society, and Read Before the Society, June 16, 1865, Philadelphia: Sherman & Co., Printers., 1865

Business positions
Preceded by Charles A. Pope	President of the American Medical Association; 1855–1856	Succeeded by Zina Pitcher
