= Walter John Kilner =

British alternative medicine practitioner

Walter John Kilner MRCP
- Born: 1847; Bury St Edmunds, Suffolk, England
- Died: 1920 (aged 72–73); Isle of Wight, England
- Education: King Edward VI School, Bury St Edmunds; St John's College, Cambridge
- Occupation: Medical electrician

Walter John Kilner MRCP (1847–1920) was a British medical electrician at St. Thomas Hospital, London. There, from 1879 to 1893, he was in charge of electrotherapy. He was also in private medical practice, in Ladbroke Grove, London.

He wrote papers on a range of subjects but is today best remembered for his late study The Human Atmosphere. In 1883, he became a Member of the Royal College of Physicians. In his spare time he was a keen chess player.

== Biography ==
Kilner was born in Bury St Edmunds. He was the son of John Kilner and Maria Garrett. He was educated at King Edward VI School and St John's College, Cambridge. He worked as a medical electrician at St. Thomas's Hospital. His brother was Charles Scott Kilner, M.B.E. of York House, Bury St Edmunds. Kilner had a daughter and two sons. He died in June 1920 at his residence on the Isle of Wight.

== The Human Atmosphere ==
In 1911 Kilner published one of the first western medical studies of the "Human Atmosphere" or aura, proposing its existence, nature and possible use in medical diagnosis and prognosis. In its conviction that the human energy field is an indicator of health and mood, Kilner's study resembles the later work of Harold Saxton Burr. However, while Burr relied upon voltmeter readings, Kilner, working before the advent of semiconductor technology, attempted to invent devices by which the naked eye might be trained to observe "auric" activity which, he hypothesised, was probably ultraviolet radiation, stating that the phenomena he saw were not affected by electromagnets.

Glass slides or "Kilner Screens" treated with alcoholic solutions of variously coloured dyes were held to train the eyes to perceive electromagnetic radiation outside the normal spectrum of visible light, namely N-rays. Treatment of the screens notably involved dicyanin, a toxic coal tar dye originally used in infrared sensitization of photographic plates. While this dye is rumored to be banned by the US Government, allegedly due to its paranormal properties, these claims are not accurate. Kilner reported that long-term viewing through these screens was not recommended and "had a very deleterious effect upon our eyes, making them very painful", but after regular viewing and sufficient training, one could dispense with the apparatus.

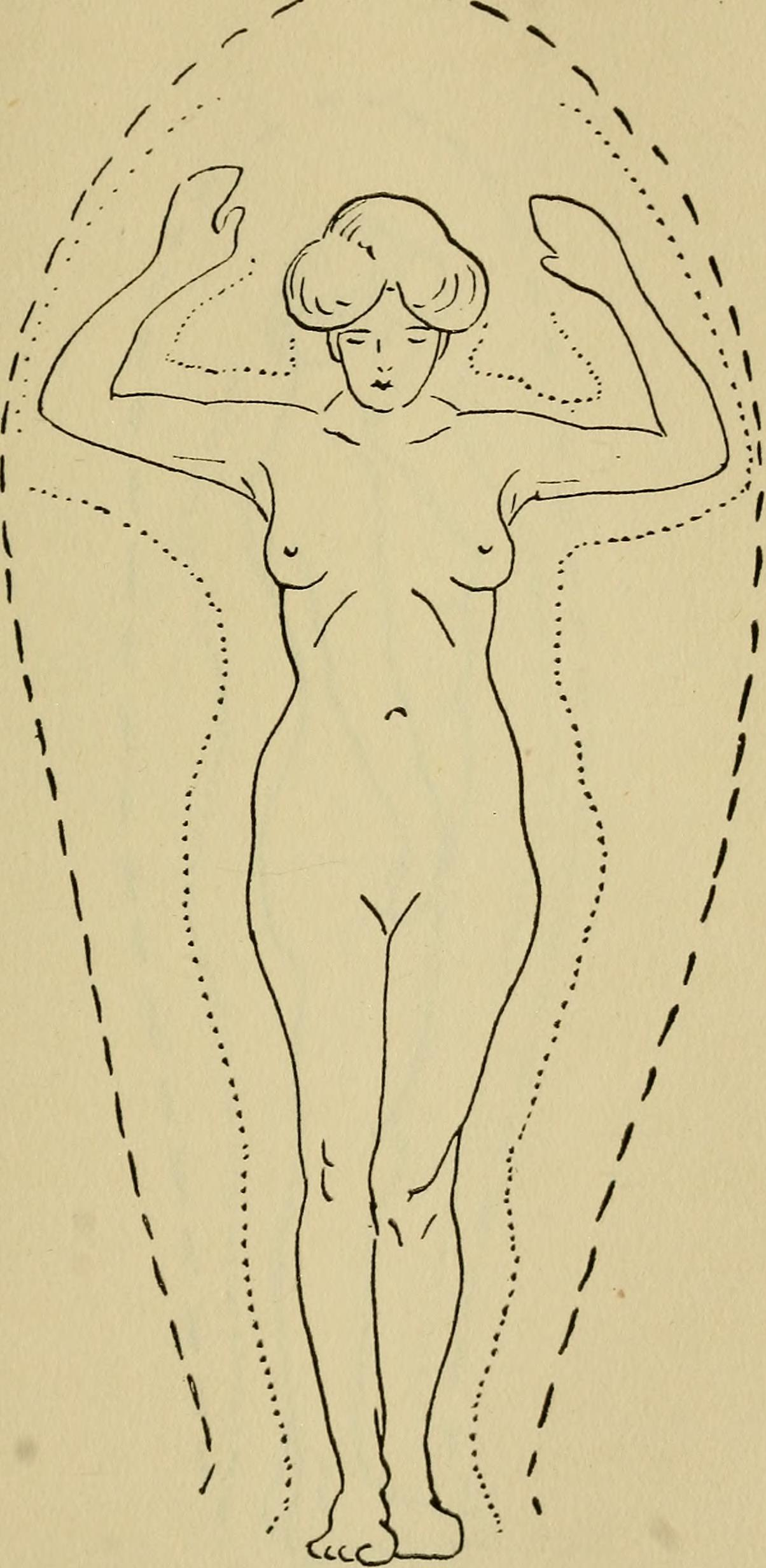
Kilner's illustration of a healthy woman with "a very fine aura", from The Human Atmosphere

According to his study, Kilner and his associates were able, on many occasions, to perceive auric formations, which he called the Etheric Double, the Inner Aura and the Outer Aura, extending several inches from patients' naked bodies, and his book gave instructions by which the reader might construct and use similar apparati.

Francis J. Rebman, a friend of Kilner, supported his research in America.

A drawback to Kilner's method was the scarcity and toxicity of the chemicals he recommended. Later, the biologist Oscar Bagnall recommended substituting the dye pinacyanol (dissolved in triethanolamine) but this dye is also not easy to obtain. Carl Edwin Lindgren has stated that cobalt blue and purple glass may be substituted for the dyes used by Kilner and Bagnall.

In 1920 a revised edition of his book was published under the title The Human Aura. Kilner's work was well-timed for the heyday of Theosophy and his findings were incorporated into Arthur E. Powell's book The Etheric Double. Powell rightly made clear that Kilner had expressly differentiated between his own work and the clairvoyance and eastern systems of spiritualism.

== Critical reception ==
In the British Medical Journal (BMJ) a 1912 review of Kilner's research stated that although Kilner contended the aura to be a "purely physical phenomenon", evidence did not support this view. Scientists from the BMJ attempted to replicate Kilner's experiments but the results were negative. The review concluded that "Dr. Kilner has failed to convince us that his "aura" is more real than Macbeth's visionary dagger."

American religious scholar J. Gordon Melton has written:

Kilner's research was largely dismissed by later researchers on light and perception, and the results he reported were seen as artifacts of the observer's own optic process rather than reflective of any emanation being produced by the subject being observed. These findings did not prevent the marketing of Kilner goggles, advertisements for which appeared in Esoteric periodicals as late as the 1970s.

Skeptical investigator Joe Nickell has described Kilner's research as pseudoscience, noting that he "uncritically accepted the validity of non-existent N-rays and clairvoyant powers."

== Publications ==
- The Human Atmosphere (1911)

== See also ==
- Aura (paranormal)
- L-field of Harold Saxton Burr
- Morphogenetic field of biologist Rupert Sheldrake
- Orgone energy of Wilhelm Reich
- Prana in Ayurveda and Yoga
- Qi or ch'i or ki in several Asian cultures, especially Chinese
- Thoughtography
- Vitalism
