= John Morris (physician) =

American physician

John Morris (September 27, 1759- 8 September 1793) was an American physician.

Born to a Quaker family in Philadelphia, his father, William Morris Jr, was a dry goods merchant who died in 1766. His mother, Margaret Hill Morris, moved John and his three younger siblings to Burlington, New Jersey, to be with her sister’s family. Also a Quaker, Margaret used her knowledge of medicine to treat soldiers during the Revolutionary War and kept journals of her experiences during that time.

He married Abigail Dorsey in 1783. Together, they had six children: Sarah (1784-1794), William Stanton (1785-1819), Benedict (1787-1790), Martha Milcah (1788-1826), Mary (1790-1790), and Margaret (1792-1832).

Morris went on to pursue a career in medicine, receiving a medical degree from the University of Pennsylvania in 1783 and practiced under his uncle, Dr. Charles Moore, in Montgomery, Pennsylvania before establishing a solo practice in Philadelphia in 1785. He was elected as a member to the American Philosophical Society in 1785. Morris participated in the founding of the Physicians College of Philadelphia with Benjamin Rush, which held its first official meeting on January 2, 1787.

During the Yellow Fever epidemic of 1793, Morris treated the citizens of Philadelphia before falling victim to the disease himself, dying in the care of his mother who was also treating the ill. His wife tragically succumbed to the disease only 8 days after her husband's passing.
