= Astley P. C. Ashhurst =

American surgeon and medical historian

- Born: Astley Paston Cooper Ashhurst; August 21, 1876
- Died: September 19, 1932 (aged 56)
- Occupation: Surgeon
- Spouse: Anna P. Campbell (m. 1930)

Astley Paston Cooper Ashhurst (August 21, 1876 – September 19, 1932) was an American surgeon and medical historian. In 1905, as a young surgeon, he observed Peter Freyer perform a suprapubic prostatectomy in London. He later co-authored the Textbook on Surgery with John B. Deaver.
