= Mütter Museum =

Science museum in Philadelphia, Pennsylvania, US

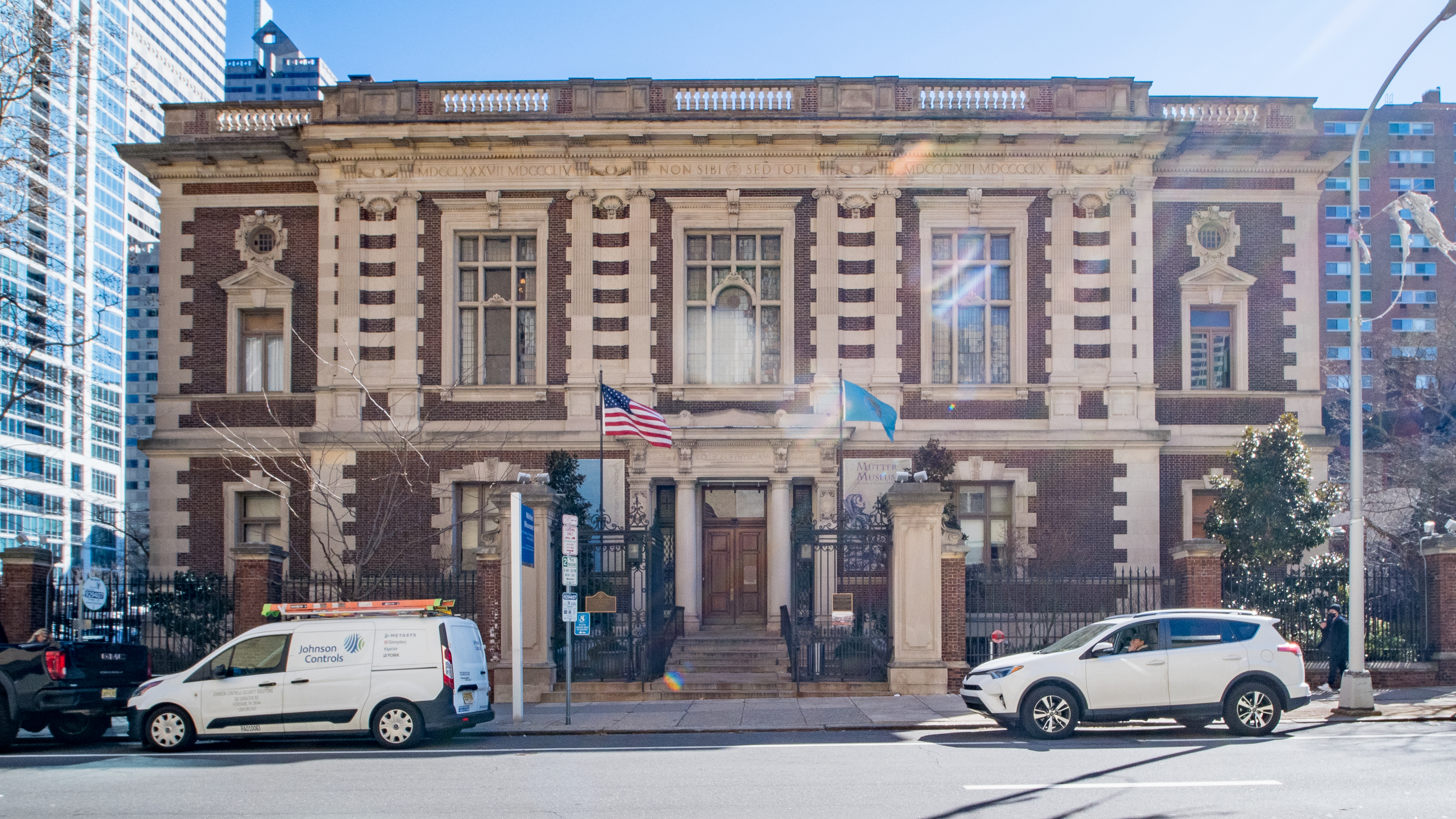
- The museum is housed within the College of Physicians of Philadelphia.
- Established: 1863 (original location); 1909 (present location)
- Location: 19 S. 22nd Street; Philadelphia, Pennsylvania, U.S.
- Coordinates: 39°57′12″N 75°10′36″W
- Type: Medical history and science
- Accreditation: Not accredited
- Collections: Medical instruments, anatomical models, biological specimens
- Collection size: 25,000+
- Visitors: 120,000+
- Founder: Thomas Dent Mütter
- Executive directors: Kate Quinn, MFA (Former Executive Director, Mütter Museum and Historical Medical Library)
- Presidents: Larry Keiser, MD
- Owner: The College of Physicians of Philadelphia
- Public transit access: 22nd Street: T SEPTA bus: 7, 31, 44, 124, 125; Philly PHLASH (at 20th and Market streets)
- Parking: On-street metered parking, parking garage at S. 21st St.
- Website: Official website

The Mütter Museum /ˈmuːtər/ is a medical history and science museum located in Center City Philadelphia, Pennsylvania, US. It contains a collection of anatomical and pathological specimens, wax models, and antique medical equipment. The museum is part of College of Physicians of Philadelphia. The original purpose of the museum, founded with a gift from Thomas Dent Mütter on December 11, 1858, was for the education of medical professionals, medical students, and invited guests of College Fellows, and did not become open to non-Fellows until the mid-1970s.

The College of Physicians of Philadelphia is itself not a teaching organization, but rather a member organization or "scientific body dedicated to the advancement of science and medicine".

The museum has a collection of over 37,000 specimens, of which about 10% were on display as of 2023. This does not include the large literary collection contained within the Historical Medical Library, which is also housed within the College of Physicians of Philadelphia.

Collection items, artifacts, and specimens were acquired globally, and as Ella Wade (curator from 1939 to 1957) says, "The Mütter Museum Committee, as the minutes show, proceeded to spend Dr. Mütter's money like sailors on shore leave". In other words, some museum material was purchased by College Fellows as they travelled the world, and they were reimbursed for each purchase and any expenses incurred in connection with acquisitions. Other collection items were donated from the private collections of physicians.

In October 2023, the Mütter Museum was awarded a grant from the Pew Center for Arts and Heritage to research the history of the collection of human remains to better understand how each body and specimen came into the museum collections and to conduct discussions with members of the public to discuss the future of the museum. The first town hall discussion took place on November 17, 2023.

== Osteological (skeletal) specimens ==
The Mütter Museum is home to over 3,000 osteological specimens, including several full skeletons. One of the most famous of these is the fully articulated skeleton of Harry Raymond Eastlack, who suffered from FOP.

Other osteological specimens include:

- The Mütter American Giant, the tallest human skeleton on exhibit in North America, at 7 ft 6 in (229 cm) tall.
- The Hyrtl Skull Collection, a collection of 139 skulls from Josef Hyrtl, an Austrian anatomist. This collection's original purpose was to show the diversity of cranial anatomy in Europeans, thereby disproving the racial science of phrenology.
- The skeleton of Mary Ashberry, a woman with achondroplasia who died in 1856 due to medical negligence during childbirth.
- 10 skulls and 5 crania with extensive syphilitic involvement, many of which are specimens from the original Mütter donation.

== Wet specimens ==
The Mütter Collection comprises almost 1,500 wet specimens acquired between the 19th and 21st centuries. These include teratological specimens, cysts, tumors and other pathologies from nearly every organ of the body.

These include:

- The heart of Robert Pendarvis, a living donor with acromegaly; when the museum took down its online exhibits and YouTube content he asked for it back
- Intestinal specimens collected during the 1849 cholera outbreak by Dr. John Neill, curator of what was then known as the Pathological Cabinet of The College of Physicians of Philadelphia
- 19th and early 20th century tattooed skin

== Wax models ==
Augmenting the real human specimens on display are numerous wax models displaying various examples of pathology in the human body. These models, mostly produced by Tramond of Paris and Joseph Towne of London, were used for educational purposes when cadavers were difficult to acquire and preserve. Some moulages are known to have used skeletal remains as a part of their construction. One of the most famous wax models on display in the Mütter Museum is the last known remaining model of Madame Dimanche, who had a, "human horn (cutaneous horn). Successfully removed after six-years growth from Madame Dimanche, a Parisian widow, in the early 19th century. From the original collection of Dr. Thomas Dent Mütter (1811-1859)".

== Other specimens ==
The museum's holdings also include:

- A malignant tumor removed from President Grover Cleveland's hard palate
- The conjoined liver and plaster torso death cast of Thai-American Siamese twins Chang and Eng Bunker
- A piece of thoracic tissue removed from John Wilkes Booth, the assassin of President Abraham Lincoln
- A section of the brain of Charles J. Guiteau, the assassin of President James A. Garfield
- The Chevalier Jackson Foreign Body Collection, a collection of 2,374 swallowed or inhaled objects that Dr. Jackson extracted from patients’ throats, esophaguses, and lungs during his almost 75-year-long career. Most of the items are on display.
- Half of Albert Einstein's brain

== Exhibitions ==
=== Dr. Benjamin Rush Medicinal Plant Garden ===
Dr. Rush helped to found the College of Physicians of Philadelphia in 1787, which is now home to the Mütter Museum. Dr. Rush pushed for the maintenance of a medicinal garden to allow College Fellows to replenish items in their medicinal chests. The Garden was eventually founded in 1937. It displays between 50 and 60 medicinal herbs and plants, which include strawberries, wormwort, and bugleweed.

== Curators ==
=== Joseph McFarland ===
Joseph McFarland was the curator of the Mütter Museum from 1937 to 1945. He published multiple papers looking into some of the more questionable histories of museum collections, including The Soap Lady, and the Mütter American Giant. McFarland was able to prove, through dogged historical and archival research, that Leidy's stories for both "The Petrified Woman" at the Mütter Museum, and "The Petrified Man" at the Wistar Institute were complete nonsense. McFarland read through the annals of The College of Physicians of Philadelphia nearly 70 years after The Mütter American Giant first graced its halls and ascertained that there truly was nothing known about the former owner.

=== Ella N. Wade ===
Ella Wade (1892–1980), began her tenure at the College of Physicians of Philadelphia as a clerk. She became the first female curator and the first curator without an MD.

=== Gretchen Worden ===
In 1974, Gretchen Worden, who had no prior work experience, wrote to the museum's curator asking for a job. She was hired as a curatorial assistant in 1975 and became the museum's curator in 1982 and its director in 1988.

Worden was a frequent guest on the Late Show with David Letterman, "displaying a mischievous glee as she frightened him with human hairballs and wicked-looking Victorian surgical tools, only to disarm him with her antic laugh" and appeared in numerous PBS, BBC and cable television documentaries (including an episode of Errol Morris' show First Person) as well as NPR's "Fresh Air with Terry Gross" on the museum's behalf. She was also instrumental in the creation of numerous Mütter Museum projects, including the popular Mütter Museum calendars and the book, The Mütter Museum: Of the College of Physicians of Philadelphia. During Worden's tenure, the visitorship of the museum grew from several hundred visitors each year to, at the time of her death, more than 60,000 tourists annually.

After her death, the Mütter Museum opened a gallery in her memory. In an article written about the gallery's September 30, 2005 opening, The New York Times described the "Gretchen Worden Room":

There are jars of preserved human kidneys and livers, and a man's skull so eaten away by tertiary syphilis that it looks like pounded rock. There are dried severed hands shiny as lacquered wood, showing their veins like leaves; a distended ovary larger than a soccer ball; spines and leg bones so twisted by rickets they're painful just to see; the skeleton of a dwarf who stood 3 feet 6 inches (1.07 m) small, next to that of a giant who towered seven and a half feet. And "Jim and Joe," the green-tinted corpse of a two-headed baby, sleeping in a bath of formaldehyde.

Worden was known for using humor and shock factor to garner interest in the museum. In the foreword of The Mütter Museum: Of the College of Physicians of Philadelphia, she wrote "While these bodies may be ugly, there is a terrifying beauty in the spirits of those forced to endure these afflictions."

== Podcast ==
In September 2020, the Mütter Museum launched a medical history podcast, entitled My Favorite Malady.

== Other related projects ==
Blast Books has published two large books of photography involving the Mütter Museum.

The first book, 2002's The Mütter Museum: Of the College of Physicians of Philadelphia, contains images of the museum's exhibits shot by contemporary fine art photographers. William Wegman, Joel-Peter Witkin and Shelby Lee Adams have work that appear in the book.

The second book was 2007's Mütter Museum Historic Medical Photographs.

Mütter, a screenplay based on the life of Mütter Museum founder Thomas Dent Mütter, won the 2003 "Set In Philadelphia" Screenwriting Award at the Philadelphia Film Festival and a Sloan Foundation Fellowship at the 2004 Hampton International Film Festival. The screenplay, written by poet and Philadelphia native Cristin O'Keefe Aptowicz, remains unproduced, although a short based on the feature-length script was created as a part of the Philadelphia Film Festival prize package.

In 2010, Aptowicz was named the 2010–2011 University of Pennsylvania ArtsEdge Writer-in-Residence and she noted that she will be using the residency to work on a biography of Thomas Dent Mütter. The museum has granted Aptowicz full access to their museum, library and archives for the duration of the residency so that she may conduct her research for the book, and the Mütter Museum's Francis C. Wood Institute for the History of Medicine has additionally awarded Aptowicz with a Wood Institute Travel Grant to help further fund and support her work on this project. In April 2013, it was announced that Aptowicz's biography of Mütter will be published in Fall 2014 by the Gotham Books division of Penguin. On September 4, 2014, Dr. Mütter's Marvels: A True Tale of Intrigue and Innovation at the Dawn of Modern Medicine was released to critical acclaim, including starred reviews in Publishers Weekly, Library Journal, School Library Journal and Kirkus Reviews, as well as lengthy positive reviews in The Wall Street Journal, The Onion's AV Club and NPR. The book would debut at #7 on The New York Times Bestseller List for Books about Health.

In 2016, Harvard University Press published Bone Rooms: From Scientific Racism to Human Prehistory in Museums. The author, Samuel J. Redman, completed a pair of residencies through the Francis C. Wood Institute for the History of Medicine program in 2010 and 2015. A chapter in the book examines the history of collecting at the Mütter Museum.
