= Dorothy Wyckoff =

American geologist

- Education: Bryn Mawr College
- Scientific career
- Thesis: Geology of the Mt. Gausta region in Telemark, Norway : a dissertation presented to the faculty of Bryn Mawr College in part fulfilment of the requirements for the degree of Doctor of Philosophy (1933)
- Doctoral students: Chi Jishang

Dorothy Wyckoff was a professor of geology at Bryn Mawr College who specialized in the study of the composition of rocks. She is also known for her work in translating Albertus Magnus' Book of Minerals.

== Early life and education ==
Wyckoff was born on July 22 1900 in Topsfield Massachusetts. She was a student at Bryn Mawr College where she studied Latin and Greek. She graduated Magna cum laude in 1921. In 1928 Wyckoff received an M.A. from Bryn Mawr. She went on to earn a Ph.D in geology in 1932 from Bryn Mawr, where she was a student of Florence Bascom. During her time at Bryn Mawr College Wyckoff received a fellowship to study in Oslo Norway where she worked there for two years after completing her Masters in geology.

The 1997 Geological Society of America article, A Life of Firsts: Florence Bascom, identifies Wyckoff as one of Bascom's students who went on to establish a professional career in geology. It also explains how Bascom trained generations of women geologists at Bryn Mawr College. Additionally, Wyckoff's archival collection at Bryn Mawr College, contains professional and academic papers from approximately 1920-1981, including correspondence, travel diaries, notes, and photographs.

== Career ==
Wyckoff was a professor of geology at Bryn Mawr College from 1930-1966, having been promoted to professor during the 1956 to 1957 academic year. While at Bryn Mawr she taught classes with Jane M. Oppenheimer and also worked with Dorothy Burr Thompson.

While working as a professor, Wyckoff was exceptional as she changed the way students learned about topographic maps. Wyckoff realized that students who were given quadrangles that omitted culture (human buildings or land manipulation) the students were much more successful at interpreting the map. She also realized that this shift from understanding the topography of the land around significant cities shifted the focus of the students from memorizing the topography of significant areas including cities towns and other landmarks to actually applying the skill of interpreting the quadrangle.

During World War II Wyckoff left Bryn Mawr to work at the U.S. Geological Survey, where she worked on preparing maps.

Wyckoff died in 1982.

== Research ==
Wyckoff's research included investigations into lizards, and based on the similarities between lizards and dinosaurs, she concluded that dinosaurs could have been colourful animals.

Dorothy Wyckoff's 1952 publication, Metamorphic Facies in the Wissahickon Schist Near Philadelphia, Pennsylvania, examined the metamorphic characteristics of mica schists and mica gneisses. Her research discussed how mineral changes occurred under changing temperature conditions, hydrothermal activity, and regional deformation. Her earliest research, Geology of the Mt. Gausta Region in Telemark, Norway (1934), is another important publication that deserves more attention.

== Selected publications ==
- MAGNUS, ALBERTUS (1967). The Book Of Minerals. Translated by Wyckoff, Dorothy. Clarendon Press Oxford.
- Wyckoff, Dorothy (1926). "Maps without culture: a new aid in the teaching of phsyiography". The Journal of Geography. 25 (8). Internet Archive. Taylor & Francis Ltd.: 307–309. Bibcode:1926JGeog..25..307W. doi:10.1080/00221342608984584.
- Ehrich, Ann M. H.; Wyckoff, Dorothy; Forrer, Emilio O. (1939). Early pottery of the Jebeleh region. Philadelphia: American philosophical Society. OCLC 1911316.
- Wyckoff, Dorothy; Oppenheimer, Jane; Ihde, Aaron J. (1951). "Teaching the History of Science". Isis. 42 (4): 308. doi:10.1086/349356. ISSN 0021-1753.
- WYCKOFF, DOROTHY (1952-01-01). "Metamorphic Facies in the Wissahickon Schist Near Philadelphia, Pennsylvania". GSA Bulletin. 63 (1): 25–58. doi:10.1130/0016-7606(1952)63[25:MFITWS]2.0.CO;2. ISSN 0016-7606.
- Wyckoff, Dorothy (1934). "Geology of the Mt. Gausta region in Telemark, Norway" (PDF). Norwegian Journal of Geology (Norsk Geologisk Tidsskrift). 13.
