= John Blair Deaver =

American surgeon and educator (1855–1931)

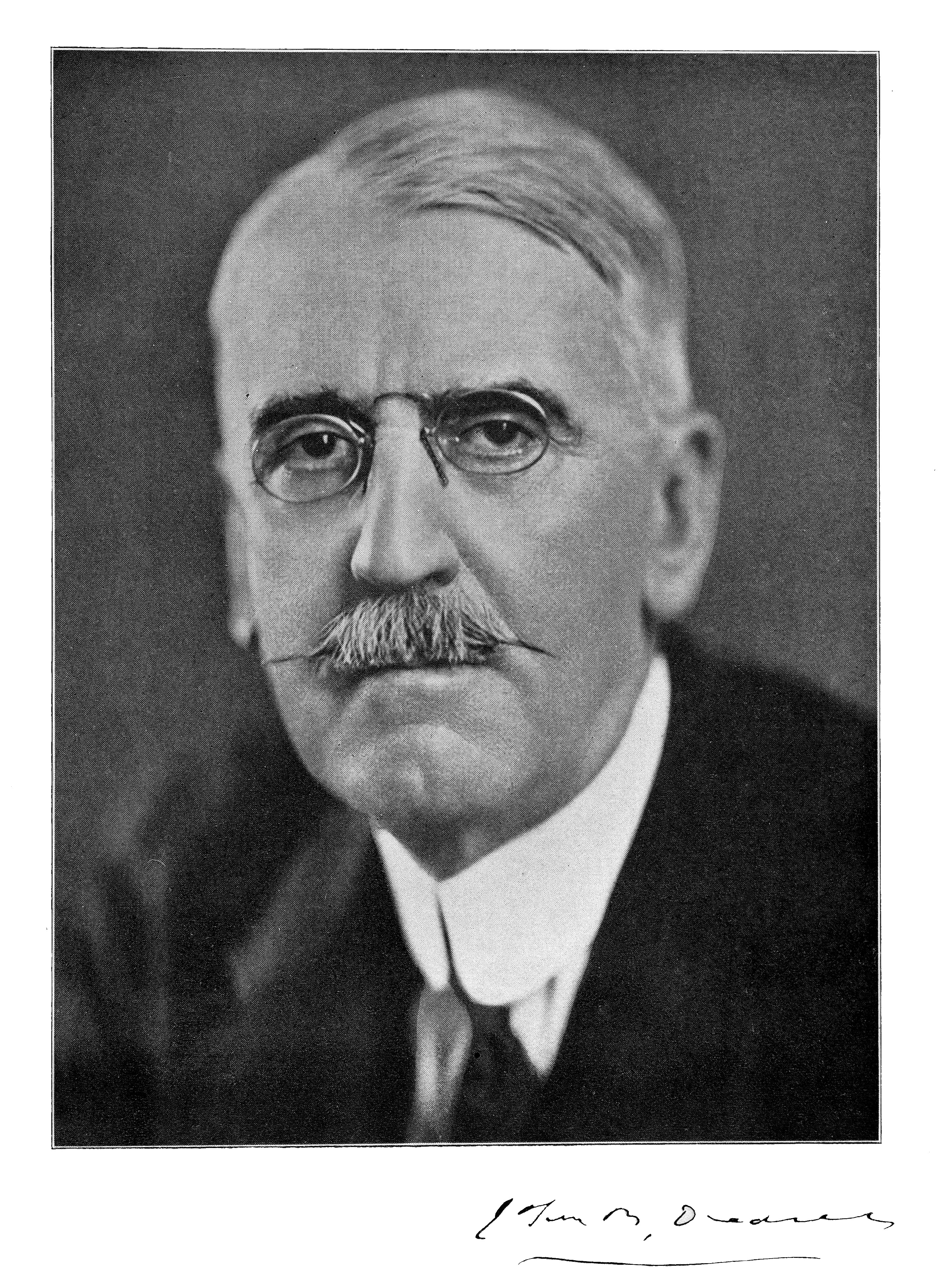
- Born: July 25, 1855; Buck, Pennsylvania, U.S.
- Died: September 25, 1931 (aged 76); Wyncote, Pennsylvania, U.S.
- Resting place: West Laurel Hill Cemetery, Bala Cynwyd, Pennsylvania, U.S.
- Education: University of Pennsylvania Medical School
- Occupation: Surgeon

John Blair Deaver (July 25, 1855 - September 25, 1931) was an American surgeon and educator who taught surgery at the University of Pennsylvania School of Medicine for over twenty years including as John Rhea Barton Professor of Surgery from 1918 to 1922 and as emeritus professor of surgery from 1922 to 1931. He served as chief of surgery at the German Hospital in Philadelphia for over 40 years. He was an innovator in abdominal surgery and an advocate of early and preventative appendectomies. He was a prolific surgeon and it is estimated he performed 100,000 surgeries during the course of his career. He was known for the Deaver incision used during appendectomies and invented the Deaver retractor used in abdominal surgeries. He was a founding member of the American College of Surgeons and served as the fifth president from 1921 to 1922.

== Early life and education ==
Deaver was born on July 25, 1855, near Buck, Pennsylvania, to Joshua Montgomery Deaver and Elizabeth Clair Moore. His father was a country doctor, and two of his brothers were also physicians. He attended West Nottingham Academy in Maryland and briefly worked as a teacher to pay for his medical education. Deaver graduated from the University of Pennsylvania Medical School in 1878, and interned at the Children's Hospital of Philadelphia and the German Hospital, now known as the Lankenau Medical Center.

He received an honorary Sc.D degree from Franklin and Marshall College and an LL.D from Villanova University.

== Career ==
He started a medical practice in Philadelphia in 1880 along with his brother Henry Clay Deaver and an anestheologist. He was known to travel to homes and perform appendectomies, Caesarean sections, and hysterectomies on patients as they lay on their kitchen tables.

He taught at the University of Pennsylvania from 1881 to 1889. He left the university due to a rivalry with J. William White who was placed in charge of surgical education. He joined the faculty of German Hospital in 1886 and was appointed Chief of the Surgical Department in 1897. He worked at German Hospital for over 40 years.

He revolutionized abdominal surgery, particularly the appendectomy. He was known for the Deaver incision used during appendectomies. He was a proponent of early and preventative surgery to address appendicitis. It is estimated that he performed 15,000 appendectomies. He typically performed all surgical actions and placed responsibility on himself for both the decision to operate and the outcome of the procedure. "Cut well, get well, stay well," was a motto often repeated by Deaver. In 1924 he stated, "If when I am taken to my reward, I am known as nothing else, I shall be satisfied to have as my epitaph: 'He fought a good fight- his life was a continuous war on the vermiform appendix."

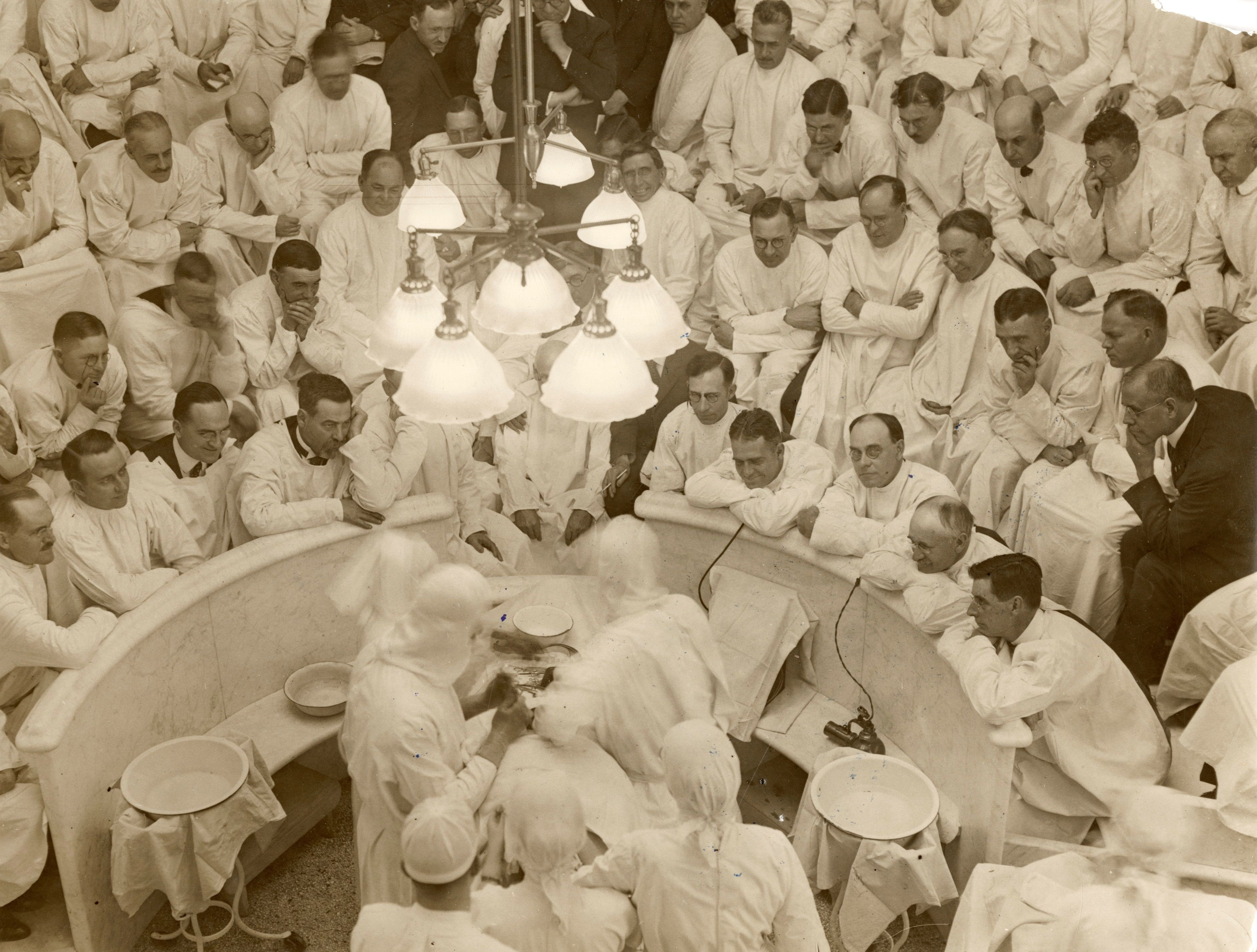
Deaver performing surgery in 1921

He held "Saturday Clinics" which were attended by surgeons from around the world. He was known to conduct 25 surgeries in an afternoon during these clinics. He was a prolific surgeon and it is estimated he performed over 100,000 procedures during the course of his medical career. One year, he performed six major surgeries every weekday. It is claimed he performed more appendectomies on physicians than any other surgeon in the United States.

He invented the Deaver Retractor, a medical instrument used in abdominal surgeries. It is not known when the device was invented, but it was first mentioned in a 1928 article of the Journal of the American Medical Association.

After the resignation of J. William White, Deaver returned to the University of Pennsylvania in 1911. He worked there as Professor of the Practice of Surgery from 1911 to 1918, as John Rhea Barton Professor of Surgery from 1918 to 1922, and as Emeritus Professor of Surgery from 1922 to 1931. The university extended the mandatory retirement age twice in order to keep him in his role. He was a consulting surgeon at several other hospitals.

He was one of the founders of the American College of Surgeons and served as the fifth president of the organization from 1921 to 1922. He served as president of the Interstate Post-Graduate Medical Association of North America, and member of many other surgical societies. He wrote five textbooks and approximately 250 articles.

In 1919, he was one of the physicians called to consult on President Woodrow Wilson. He was also called on by President Calvin Coolidge to consult on the fatal illness of his son, Calvin Coolidge, Jr.

He died September 25, 1931, due to anemia at his home in Wyncote, Pennsylvania, and was interred at West Laurel Hill Cemetery in Bala Cynwyd, Pennsylvania. It was rumored that he suffered from prostate cancer but it is not known since he asked for all medical records related to the case to be destroyed.

== Personal life ==
In 1889, Deaver married Caroline Randall and they had four children: Elizabeth, John, Harriet, and Joshua. John B. Deaver's son, Joshua Montgomery Deaver, would also become a physician with a long career at Lankenau Medical Center.

== Legacy ==
In 1897, the University of Pennsylvania established the John B. Deaver Surgical Society to support students interested in becoming surgeons. The society was active for 70 years.

== Publications ==
- A Treatise on Appendicitis, Philadelphia: P. Blakiston & Co., 1896
- Surgical Anatomy: A Treatise on Human Anatomy In Its Application to the Practice of Medicine and Surgery, Philadelphia: P. Blakiston's Son & Co., 1903
- Surgery of the Upper Abdomen, coauthored by Astley Paston Cooper Ashhurst, Philadelphia: P. Blakiston & Co., 1909
- The Breast: Its Anomalies, Its Diseases, and Their Treatment, coauthored by Joseph McFarland, Philadelphia: P. Blakiston's Son & Co., 1917
- Enlargement of the Prostate, Philadelphia: P. Balkiston's Son & Co., 1922
