= Franklin Bache =

American physician (1792-1864)

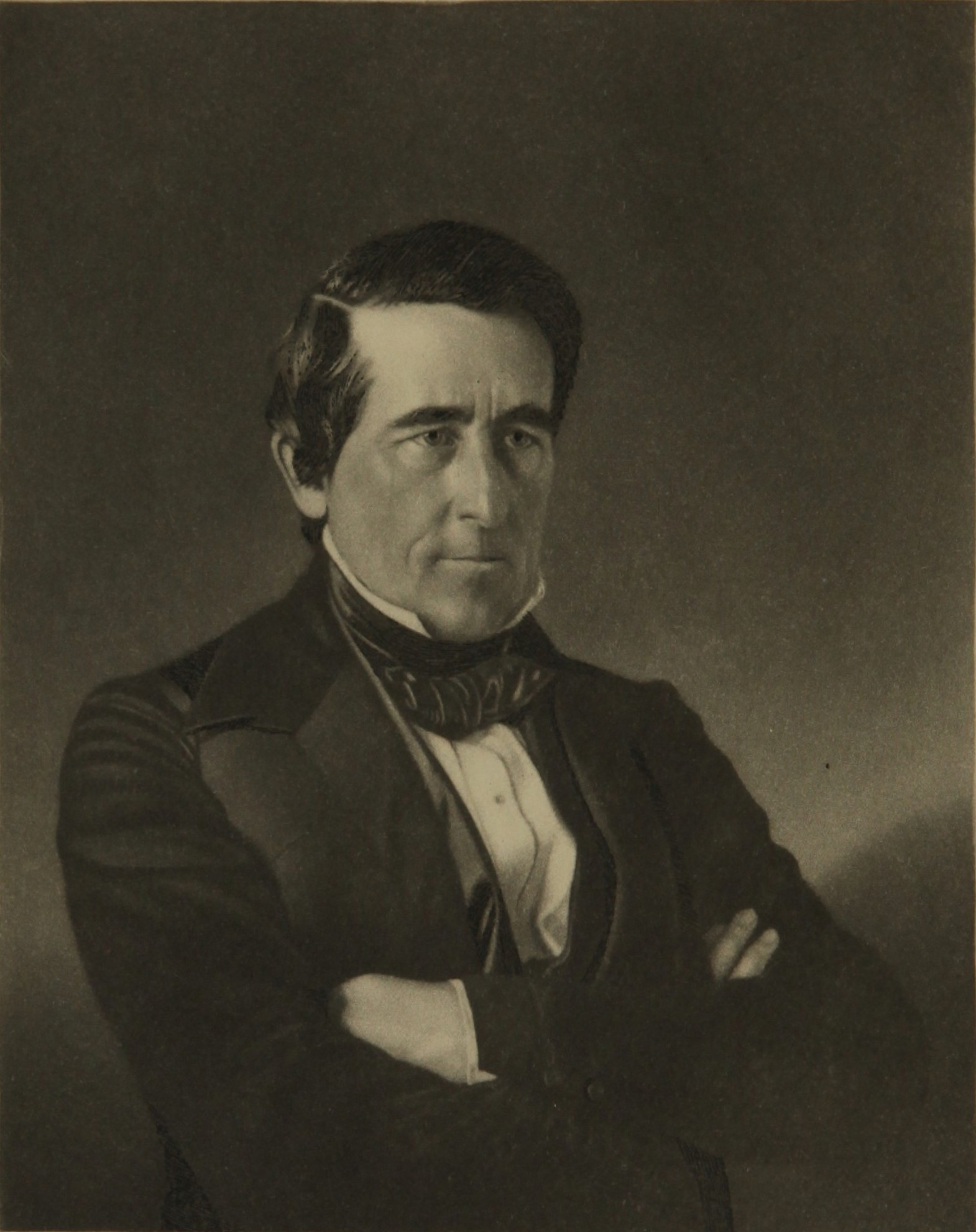
- Born: October 25, 1792; Philadelphia
- Died: March 19, 1864 (aged 71); Philadelphia
- Alma mater: University of Pennsylvania; Perelman School of Medicine
- Occupation: Medical doctor, editor, writer
- Parent(s): Benjamin Franklin Bache; Margaret Hartman Markoe Bache

Franklin Bache (October 25, 1792 – March 19, 1864) was an American medical doctor, chemist, professor and writer from Pennsylvania. He taught chemistry at West Point Academy, the Franklin Institute, Philadelphia College of Pharmacy and Jefferson Medical College. He published several scientific textbooks including a pharmacopoeia with Dr. George Bacon Wood in 1830 that became the basis of the U.S. Pharmacopoeia and U.S. Dispensatory. He was the first American to perform original research on the study of acupuncture for pain treatment.

He was the son of Benjamin Franklin Bache and great-grandson of Benjamin Franklin.

== Early life and education ==
Bache was born on October 25, 1792 in Philadelphia to Benjamin Franklin Bache and Margaret Hartman Markoe. He was the great-grandson of Benjamin Franklin. He graduated from the University of Pennsylvania in 1810 and began to study medicine under Dr. Benjamin Rush. He left medical school in 1813 and entered the United States Army as a surgeons mate in an infantry division during the War of 1812. He returned to school after the war and received his medical diploma from the University of Pennsylvania in 1814.

== Career ==
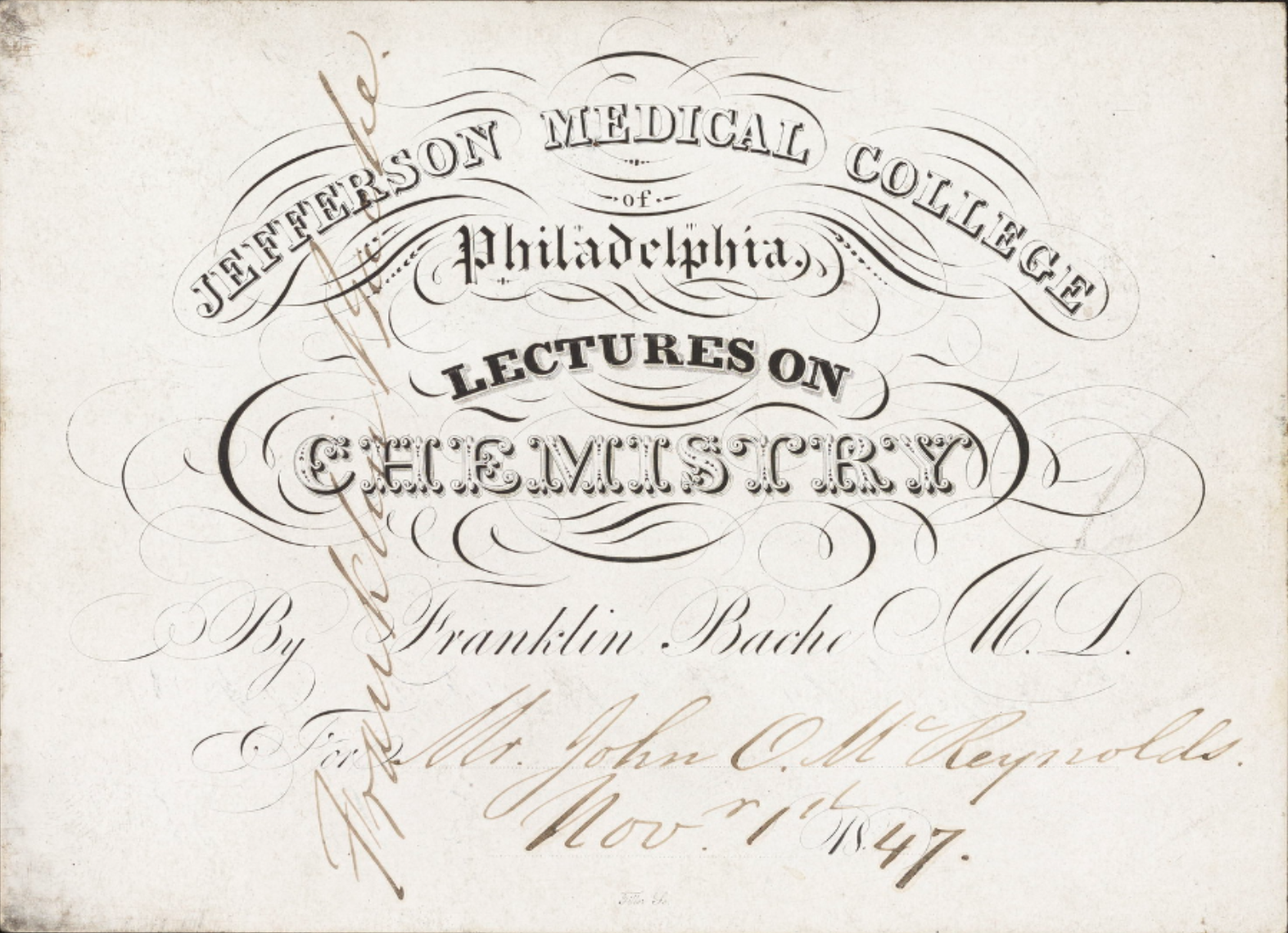
Ticket for Franklin Bache lecture on Chemistry, November 1, 1847 at Jefferson Medical College

He was commissioned a surgeon in the U.S. Army in 1814 and taught at West Point Academy. He resigned from the Army in 1816 and began the practice of medicine in Philadelphia. In 1821, he published the first American version of the Dictionary of Chemistry. In 1822, he succeeded Gerard Troost as professor of chemistry at the Philadelphia College of Pharmacy and became the chair of materia medica from 1831 to 1841. He was physician to the Walnut Street Prison from 1826 to 1832, professor of chemistry at the Franklin Institute from 1829 to 1836 and physician to the Eastern State Penitentiary. He served as professor of chemistry at Jefferson Medical College from 1841 until his death.

In 1819 he published a System of Chemistry for the Use of Students of Medicine. Along with Dr. George B. Wood, he prepared a pharmacopoeia in 1830 that was adopted by a national convention of physicians, and became the basis of the U. S. Pharmacopoeia and U. S. Dispensatory. He continued to refine and publish new versions of the pharmacopeia with Dr. Wood, from 1833 until his death. He published a Supplement to Henry's Chemistry (1823); Letters on Separate Confinement of Prisoners (1829-'30); and Introductory Lectures on Chemistry (1841-'52). He partnered with Dr. Robert Hare and edited the American version of Andrew Ure's Dictionary of Chemistry. From 1823 to 1832, he was one of the editors of the North American Medical and Surgical Journal and contributed significantly to other scientific journals. He prepared for publication a treatise by chemist James Cutbush titled A System of Pyrotechny, published after Cutbush's death.

Bache was the first American to perform original research on the study of acupuncture to relieve pain. While working at the state penitentiary, he treated 12 different prisoners with various ailments including muscular rheumatism, chronic pain, neuralgia and ophthalmia.

He was elected a member of the Franklin Institute in 1827. He was elected a member of the American Philosophical Society in 1820 and served as president from 1854 to 1855. He served as vice-president of the College of Physicians of Philadelphia and as president of the deaf and dumb asylum corporation.

== Personal life ==
In 1818, Bache married Aglaé Dabadie. She died of consumption in May 1835. He was a Master Mason in the Franklin Lodge, No. 134 of the Free and Accepted Masons named after his great-grandfather.

== Death and legacy ==
Bache died of typhoid fever on 19 March 1864 in Philadelphia and was interred at Laurel Hill Cemetery. A memoir of him was published and presented to the American Philosophical Society by Dr. George B. Wood in 1865.

== Publications ==
- A System of Chemistry for the Use of Students of Medicine, William Fry, Philadelphia, 1819
- A Dictionary of Chemistry, on the Basis of Mr. Nicholson's; in which the Principles of the Science are Investigated Anew, and its Applications to the Phenomena of Nature, Medicine, Mineralogy, Agriculture, and Manufactures, Detailed, Robert Desilver, Philadelphia, 1821
- Observations and Reflections on the Penitentiary System. A Letter from Franklin Bache, M.D. to Roberts Vaux, Jasper Harding, Philadelphia, 1829
- Elements of Chemistry, Including the Recent Discoveries and Doctrines of the Science, John Grigg, Philadelphia, 1830
- The Dispensatory of the United States of America, Grigg & Elliot, Philadelphia, 1839
- An Obituary Notice of Thomas T. Hewson, M.D., Late President of the Philadelphia College of Physicians, W.F. Geddes, Philadelphia, 1850
- Valedictory Address to the Graduates of Jefferson Medical College. Delivered at the Public Commencement, held March 15, 1859, Joseph M. Wilson, Philadelphia, 1859
