= Chi Jishang =

Chinese geologist and petrologist

- Born: June 25, 1917; Anlu County, Hubei Province, China
- Died: January 1, 1994 (aged 76)
- Other names: 池际尚, Chi-Shang Ch'ih
- Occupations: geologist, petrologist

Chi Jishang (Note: In this Chinese name, the family name is Chi.) (Chinese: 池际尚, 1917 – 1994) was a Chinese geologist, petrologist, and a member of the Chinese Communist Party. She is a pioneer in petrofabric studies in China, primarily known for her work on kimberlite diamond deposits. She was the first scientist to propose a formula that can help identify which kimberlites contain diamonds.

== Life ==
Chi, born in Anlu County of Hubei Province, was the fourth of five children. When she was four, the family moved to Beijing. There, she went to school and graduated from the associated high school of Beijing Normal University in 1936. She went on to major in physics at Tsinghua University.

=== Joining the Chinese Communist Party ===
During her university years, she joined the Chinese Communist Party and participated in anti-Japanese activities. However, when the Second Sino-Japanese War broke out, her family lost their income source and many succumbed to illness, disease, and death. She eventually continued her studies as a 'refugee student' in Hunan, where she also joined the communist party's Battlefield Corps of Hunan Youth. In 1938, she joined the Chinese Communist Party by recommendation from her female classmate at Tsinghua University.

=== Beginning her studies in geology ===
In the same year, she received help from a geology professor, a father of a friend, to resume her studies at the National Southwestern Associated University. She chose to major in the emerging field of geology in China, a practical discipline that will enable her to work in China's mining industry. Chi was recognized with the Ma Yisi Award for working in highly risky remote areas as a woman (Ma Yisi was an early woman geologist murdered by bandits while doing field work). In Yunan province, she discovered a quality iron mine. She graduated in 1941 and continued to teach at the university as a teaching assistant, covering topics such as "General geology," "Stratigraphy," and "Mineral deposit geology."

=== Years in the US ===
In 1946, Chi received a scholarship at Bryn Mawr College with a recommendation letter from geologist Fuli Yuan, where she completed her M.A. and PhD studies. She worked on her Ph.D. dissertation under Dorothy Wyckoff, publishing her thesis "Structural Petrology of the Wissahickon Schist near Philadelphia, Pennsylvania, with special reference to granitization" in the Bulletin of the Geological Society of America in 1949. Thereafter, she worked as a research assistant for petrologist Francis John Turner at University of California, Berkeley until 1950.

=== Back to China ===
After the creation of the People's Republic of China, Chi wrote Fuli Yuan about returning to China and later joined him at Tsinghua University as an associate professor in 1950. In 1952, due to a nation-wide reformation of the higher education system, she was transferred to the then Beijing Institute of Geology (now China University of Geosciences (Wuhan)) as a professor. There, she became the chair of an department that governed the teaching and research of fossil fuels. In 1954, she became the vice-chair of the department of inflammable minerals geology and exploration.

Chi reportedly "disappeared" from the public scene during the Cultural Revolution. Her husband and son were both prosecuted during that period. Nevertheless, she taught and trained students and researchers in the Hubei, Fujian, Jiangxi, Hebei provinces and conducted field work on kimberlites in the Hubei, Liaoning, and Henan regions. As the Cultural Revolution ended, she became involved in the establishment of the Wuhan College of Geology (now China University of Geosciences (Wuhan)) from 1975 to 1984, where she headed several sections and departments of the institute, eventually becoming vice-president. She also chaired the "721 University" system in collaboration with the Hubei province department of mineralogy. During this period, she developed numerous textbooks and training materials in Chinese.

She served multiple high-level governing positions in the Communist Party, receiving many honors such as National March 8th Red-Banner Holder. In 1980, she became an academian of the Academic Division of Earth Sciences of the Chinese Academy of Sciences.

Chi married Li Pu in 1946, a fellow petrologist at the geochemistry institute of the Chinese Academy of Sciences. His death in 1967 was attributed to the Cultural Revolution. They have one son. Chi fell gravely ill in 1991, dying in 1994 in Beijing.

== Research ==
Chi led important geological surveys of China, including the Sino-Soviet geological survey of the Qilian Mountain from 1955 to 1956, a four-year survey of central and western Shandong in 1958 with the students and staff of Beijing Geological School, and a rock survey and classification of the Yanshan granite in the Badaling area close to Beijing in the early 1960s. The four-type classification system for granite is still used to this day in Chinese geology.

In 1965, the first diamonds were discovered in China. Chi was placed in charge, by the Ministry of Geology, to lead the technical affairs of the Shandong 613 Scientific Research Team, which conducted fieldwork and lab work to map diamond-bearing kimberlite in the Shandong area. In two years, the team completed research papers, training sessions, studies, and offered guidance on diamond-containing kimberlite. Their work was recognized in the 1978 National Science Conference. The team disbanded during the Cultural Revolution.

After the cultural revolution, Chi worked at the Wuhan College of Geology (now China University of Geosciences (Wuhan)), where her projects included the investigation of Hubei kimberlite. She participated in many international events as a representative of the Chinese governemtn, including the United Nations International Geological Cooperation Plan (IGCP).

One of her major works, "A Study on the Cenozoic Besalt Rocks and Upper Mantle of East China (Including Kimberlite)," was the result of fieldwork in east China from 1981 to 1984. It set a new standard in both the theory and applied science of mining and prospecting and won First Prize in the Ministry of Geology and Mining's Achievement in Science and Technology Awards in 1989.

Throughout the 1980s and 1990s, Chi was involved in projects funded by the National Natural Sciences Foundation, the Ministry of Geology and Mining, the State Education Commission, Science and Technology Foundation, and parts of the Seventh Five-Year Plan of China. In total, the range of her fieldwork covered more than 20 Chinese provinces and self-governing areas.

== Legacy ==
Chi was the first scientist to propose a formula to identify kimberlites that contain diamonds.

Her major scientific contributions can be summarized as follows:

- She tabulated the characteristics and composition of minerals that can serve as indicators for diamond prospecting.
- She proposed a classification and naming scheme for kimberlite.
- She identified different forms of diamond-containing kimberlite.

After her death in 1994, on March 4, the Communist Party organized a memorial conference with more than 1000 attendees, sending out an official notice for departments and industries in higher education, technology, mining, etc., to organize memorial events.

On her 80th anniversary, her students and colleagues put together a collection of her papers to commemorate her life and work. On her 90th anniversary, the Chinese journal "Geoscience" published a special issue while the China University of Geosciences hosted a memorial conference in her name. In 2017, the China University of Geosciences (Beijing) hosted the 100th anniversary memorial conference.

== Selected publications ==
- Chi-Shang, Ch’ih, 1950. Structural Petrology of the Wissahickon Schist near Philadelphia, Pennsylvania, with special reference to granitization, Bulletin of the Geological Society of America, 61, 923–956.
- Turner, F.J., Chi-Shang, C., 1950. Notes on survival of fabric character in Yule Marble after heating to 700 deg C. American Journal of Science, 248, 347–354.
- Turner, F.J., Chi-Shang, C., 1951. Deformation of Yule Marble: Tart III – observed fabric changes due to deformation at 10,000 atmospheres confining pressure, room temperature, dry. Bulletin of the Geological Society of America, 62, 887-906
- Chi-Shang, Ch’ih, 19XX. A study on the Cenozoic Basalt Rocks and Upper Mantle of East China (including Kimberlite).
