= Elaine Zackai =

Professor of pediatrics

Prof Elaine H. Zackai
- Education: New York University College of Arts & Science
- Alma mater: New York University School of Medicine
- Scientific career
- Fields: Pediatrics, genetics
- Institutions: Children's Hospital of Philadelphia

Elaine H. Zackai is a Professor of Pediatrics, Director of Clinical Genetics, and the Director of the Clinical Genetics Center at Children's Hospital of Philadelphia (CHOP).

== Biography ==
She was born in Brooklyn in 1943, to a metallurgist and a high school teacher.

Zackai completed her B.A. at the New York University College of Arts & Science in 1964, followed by her M.D. at New York University School of Medicine in 1968.

She is a member of multiple professional organisations, sits on multiple academic and institutional committees, and holds multiple professorships.

She is also a founding Fellow of the American College of Medical Genetics and Genomics.

== Research ==
Her research has included genetic factors relating to birth defects, syndromes relating to chromosomal translocation, and 22q gene deletion.

== Awards and honours ==
- 1991 - Fellow, College of Physicians of Philadelphia
- 2002 - Blockley-Osler Award
- 2003 - Letitia and Alice Scott Endowed Chair in Genetics and Molecular Biology
- 2007 - Master Clinician Award, Children's Hospital of Philadelphia
- 2015 - Distinguished Alumni Award, Children's Hospital of Philadelphia
- 2016 - American Society of Human Genetics Mentorship Award
- 2022 - American College of Medical Genetics and Genomics Foundation for Genetic and Genomic Medicine's David L. Rimoin Lifetime Achievement Award in Medical Genetics

== Selected publications ==
- 22q11.2 deletion syndrome, Nature Reviews Disease Primers volume 1, Article number: 15071 (2015), doi:10.1038/nrdp.2015.71
- PTEN Mutation Spectrum and Genotype-Phenotype Correlations in Bannayan-Riley-Ruvalcaba Syndrome Suggest a Single Entity With Cowden Syndrome, Human Molecular Genetics, Volume 8, Issue 8, August 1999, Pages 1461–1472, doi:10.1093/hmg/8.8.1461
- Nonlethal presentations of CYP26B1-related skeletal anomalies and multiple synostoses syndrome, 2021, doi:10.1002/ajmg.a.62387
