= John Spangler Nicholas =

- Born: March 10, 1895; Kintnersville, Pennsylvania, U.S.
- Died: September 11, 1963 (aged 68)

Academic background
- Education: Gettysburg College (BS, MS); Yale University (PhD)
- Doctoral advisor: Ross Granville Harrison

Academic work
- Discipline: Zoology
- Sub-discipline: Embryology
- Institutions: University of Pittsburgh; Yale University

John Spangler Nicholas (March 10, 1895 – September 11, 1963) was an American embryologist and a professor of zoology at Yale University. He contributed to experimental techniques for the study of embryology through transplants, the early stage development of teleost and mammalian zygotes.

== Early life and education ==
Nicholas was born in Kintnersville, Pennsylvania, the only child of Reverend Samuel Trauger and Elizabeth Ellen. Although the parents hoped he would join the Lutheran order, he chose to study medicine, influenced by an uncle, Harry Spangler. He earned a Bachelor of Science and Master of Science from Gettysburg College. He received a PhD from Yale University in 1921.

== Career ==
In 1915, he taught anatomy at the University of Pittsburgh at the invitation of Davenport Hooker. Nicholas enlisted with the United States Army Medical Corps during World War I and returned following discharge in 1919. He joined Yale in 1926 and became Sterling Professor of Zoology in 1939. He served at Yale until his retirement in 1963.

Nicholas followed experiments in the asymmetry of development which had been begun by his Yale supervisor Ross G. Harrison. Harrison had shown that grafts develop as left or right limbs based on the orientation in which a limb bud was grafted. Spangler showed that this orientation was defined by a narrow ring of cells. He later developed experimental methods to grow rat embryos in chicken chorioallantois.

== Personal life ==
Nicholas married Helen Benton Brown in 1921.
