= Joseph McFarland =

American physician (1868–1945)

Joseph McFarland (February 9, 1868 – 1945) was an American physician known for his work in bacteriology, toxinology, and pathology. He was the curator of the Mutter Museum between 1936 and his death in 1945.
