= Benjamin Duffield (physician) =

American physician and co-founder of College of Physicians of Philadelphia

- Born: November 3, 1753; Bucks County, Pennsylvania
- Died: December 13, 1799 (aged 46); Philadelphia, Pennsylvania
- Occupation: Physician
- Parent(s): Edward Duffield and Catherine (Parry) Duffield

Benjamin Duffield (November 3, 1753 – December 13, 1799) was an American physician and one of the founding members of the College of Physicians of Philadelphia (1787).

== Formative years ==
Born in Bucks County, Pennsylvania, on November 3, 1753, Benjamin Duffield was a son of clockmaker Edward Duffield and Catherine (Parry) Duffield. He studied medicine at the University of Pennsylvania, graduating in 1774. Immediately thereafter, he went to Edinburgh to complete his studies, and brought with him a letter of introduction to a local Lord, penned by his father's friend, Benjamin Franklin.

== Medical career ==
Upon his return from Scotland, he began working as a surgeon in a military hospital in Reading, Pennsylvania, before opening a private practice in Philadelphia. He was elected as a member of the American Philosophical Society in 1786. Duffield's large practice established himself in the city's medical field and not long after he became a founding member of the College of Physicians of Philadelphia (1787). He also worked at the Bush Hill yellow fever hospital upon the outbreak of that disease (1793), held lectures on midwifery, and served as a physician to the Walnut street prison.

A document dating from 1797 written by him lists the twenty-one physicians who were members of the College of Physicians of Philadelphia at the time. It is now kept in the Historical Medical Library of The College of Physicians of Philadelphia. On the reverse side was a list by Caspar Wistar of twelve physicians who were not members.

He died on December 13, 1799.
