= Affadilla Deaver =

Conductor on the Underground Railroad

Affadilla Deaver (February 1808, in Lisbon, Maine – March 11, 1876, in York Township, Ohio) was a conductor on the Underground Railroad.

== Life ==
Deaver was born Affadilla Moody to Lyda and Nathan Moody in 1808, with birthdate reported both as February 24 and February 22. She moved from her birthplace of Lisbon, Maine, with her family when she was nine.

The Moodys moved to Morgan County, Ohio, the same county where Deavertown is located. In 1828, Affadilla married Reuben Deaver - who founded Deavertown with his brother Levi. Reuben had left Deavertown to become a millwright, but returned in 1825.

Deaver died on March 11, 1876, in York Township, Ohio.

== Underground Railroad ==
After marriage, the Deavers became active in the Underground Railroad.

On one occasion, Affadilla was on her way to Roseville, heading down Wigton's hill, when her wagon got stuck. Four farmers unstuck the wagon and Affadilla continued on, with the several slaves hiding in the bottom of the wagon undetected by the pro-slavery farmers.

A photo of Affadilla was collected by Wilbur H. Siebert in his abolitionist research during the 1890s.
