= Paul Alfred Weiss =

Austrian biologist

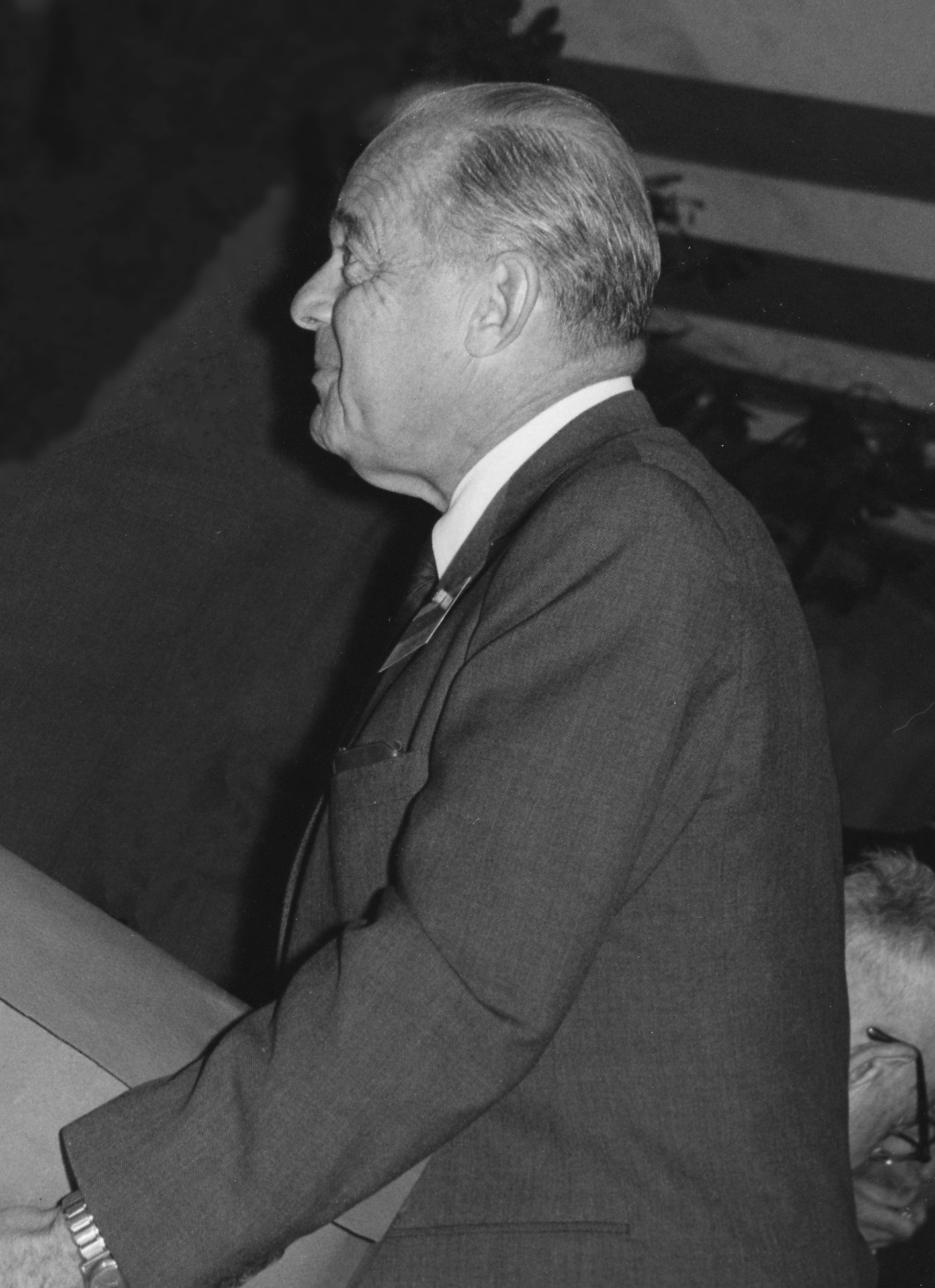
- Weiss in 1963
- Born: March 21, 1898; Vienna, Austria-Hungary
- Died: September 8, 1989 (aged 91); White Plains, New York, U.S.
- Education: Technische Hochschule Wien (1922)
- Known for: Morphogenesis developmental biology neurobiology
- Awards: National Medal of Science (1979)
- Scientific career
- Fields: Developmental biology
- Workplaces: Vienna University of Technology; Biological Research Institute of the Vienna Academy of Sciences; Yale University; University of Chicago; Rockefeller University
- Doctoral advisor: Hans Leo Przibram
- Doctoral students: Roger Sperry

Paul Alfred Weiss (German: [vaɪs]; March 21, 1898 – September 8, 1989) was an Austrian biologist who specialised in morphogenesis, development, differentiation and neurobiology. A teacher, experimenter and theorist, he made a lasting contribution to science in his lengthy career, throughout which he sought to encourage specialists in different fields to meet and share insights.

== Life and career ==
Paul Weiss was born in Vienna, the son of a Jewish couple, Carl S. Weiss, a businessman, and Rosalie Kohn Weiss. His background favoured music, poetry, and philosophy – Weiss himself was a violinist – but an uncle encouraged an interest in science. Weiss received his baccalaureate in 1916.

After the end of the First World War, having served for three years as an officer in the artillery, he commenced studies in mechanical engineering at the Technische Hochschule in Vienna, (now Vienna University of Technology). He then shifted his focus to biology with a minor in physics. He absorbed the studies of Edmond B. Wilson, Edwin G. Concklin, and Theodor Boveri and completed his doctoral thesis in 1922 under Hans Leo Przibram, then director of the Biological Research Institute of the Academy of Sciences in Vienna, on the responses of butterflies to light and gravity.

After completing his thesis he traveled widely in Europe, becoming an assistant director of the Biological Research Institute of the Vienna Academy of Sciences. In 1926 he married Maria Helen Blaschka.

His studies of limb regeneration in newts showed that a complete limb could regenerate even if particular tissue forms were removed from the stump: the required types of tissue would reform. He studied cell differentiation and the transplanting and reforming of connections in the nerves of limbs, using newts and frogs for his experiments. He went on to consider neurobiology and morphogenesis. He introduced the idea of the "natural experiment" – the quest for suggestive examples from nature – and this became a favourite teaching device.

In 1930 a prospective post at the University of Frankfurt was lost due to the depression and Weiss moved to the United States. In 1931, after studying developing cell cultures for some time, Weiss won a Sterling fellowship to work with Ross Granville Harrison at Yale. He took US citizenship in 1939, publishing his Principles of Development the same year. From 1933 to 1954, after working briefly at Yale, he taught at the University of Chicago.

In his work on tissue cultures Weiss outlined several features of cell proliferation: he showed how cell-patterns are affected by their substrate and, through grafts, proved that basic neural patterns of coordination were self-differentiating rather than learned, though higher vertebrates can "retrain" reflexes.

During World War II he worked with the American government on nerve injury. In 1947 he was elected to the National Academy of Sciences. He was elected to the American Philosophical Society in 1953. In 1954 he became one of the first professors at the new Rockefeller University in New York, where he remained for fifteen years. He was elected to the American Academy of Arts and Sciences that same year. Paul Weiss was awarded the National Medal of Science by President Jimmy Carter in 1979. He died at White Plains, New York, on September 8, 1989, at the age of 91.

In similarity to Ludwig von Bertalanffy he described organisms in a systems biology approach with concepts like hierarchically organized systems or primary activity.

== Bibliography ==
- Weiss, Paul (1973). The Science of Life. The Living System – A System for Living. Mount Kisco, NY: Futura Publishing Company. ISBN 0-87993-034-9.

== See also ==
- Organicism
- Morphogenetic fields
