= Morphogenetic field =

Developmental biology concept

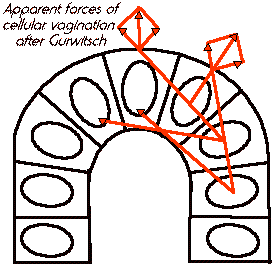
Before the emergence of modern genetics, A. G. Gurwitsch analysed the embryonic development of the sea urchin in 1910 as a vector-field − a mathematical construct for analysis of remote effects − as if the proliferation of cells into organs were brought about by putative external forces.

In the developmental biology of the early twentieth century, a morphogenetic field is a research hypothesis and a discrete region of cells in an embryo.

The term morphogenetic field conceptualizes the scientific experimental finding that an embryonic group of cells, for example a forelimb bud, could be transplanted to another part of the embryo and in ongoing individual development still give rise to a forelimb at an odd place of the organism. And it describes a group of embryonic cells able to respond to localized biochemical signals − called field − leading to the genesis of morphological structures: tissues, organs, or parts of an organism.

The spatial and temporal extents of such a region of embryonic stem cells are dynamic, and within it is a collection of interacting cells out of which a particular tissue, organ, or body part is formed. As a group, the cells within a morphogenetic field in an embryo are constrained: thus, cells in a limb field will become a limb tissue, those in a heart field will become heart tissue. Individual cells within a morphogenetic field in an embryo are flexible: thus, cells in a cardiac field can be redirected via cell-to-cell signaling to replace damaged or missing cells.

The Imaginal disc in larvae is an example of a discrete morphogenetic field region of cells in an insect embryo.

== History ==
The concept of the morphogenetic field was first introduced in 1910 by Alexander G. Gurwitsch. Experimental support was provided by Ross Granville Harrison's experiments transplanting fragments of a newt embryo into different locations.

Harrison was able to identify "fields" of cells producing organs such as limbs, tail and gills and to show that these fields could be fragmented or have undifferentiated cells added and a complete normal final structure would still result. It was thus considered that it was the "field" of cells, rather than individual cells, that were patterned for subsequent development of particular organs. The field concept was developed further by Harrison's friend Hans Spemann, and then by Paul Weiss and others. The concept was similar to the meaning of the term entelechy of vitalists like Hans Adolf Eduard Driesch (1867–1941). Thus the field hypothesis of ontogeny became fundamental in the early twentieth century to the study of embryological development.

By the 1930s, however, the work of geneticists, especially Thomas Hunt Morgan, revealed the importance of chromosomes and genes for controlling development, and the rise of the new synthesis in evolutionary biology lessened the perceived importance of the field hypothesis. Morgan was a particularly harsh critic of fields since the gene and the field were perceived as competitors for recognition as the basic unit of ontogeny. With the discovery and mapping of master control genes, such as the homeobox genes which were first discovered in 1983, the pre-eminence of genes seemed assured.

In the late twentieth century the field concept of ontogenesis was "rediscovered" as a useful part of developmental biology. It was found, for example, that different mutations could cause the same malformations, suggesting that the mutations were affecting a complex of structures as a unit, a unit that might correspond to the field of early 20th century embryology. In 1996 Scott F. Gilbert proposed that the morphogenetic field was a middle ground between genes and evolution. That is, genes act upon fields, which then act upon the developing organism. Then in 2000 Jessica Bolker described morphogenetic fields not merely as incipient structures or organs, but as dynamic entities with their own localized development processes, which are central to the emerging field of evolutionary developmental biology ("evo-devo").

In 2005, Sean B. Carroll and colleagues mention morphogenetic fields merely as a concept proposed by early embryologists to explain the finding that a forelimb bud could be transplanted and still give rise to a forelimb; they define field simply as "a discrete region" in an embryo.
