= Thomas Dent Mütter =

American surgeon (1811–1859)

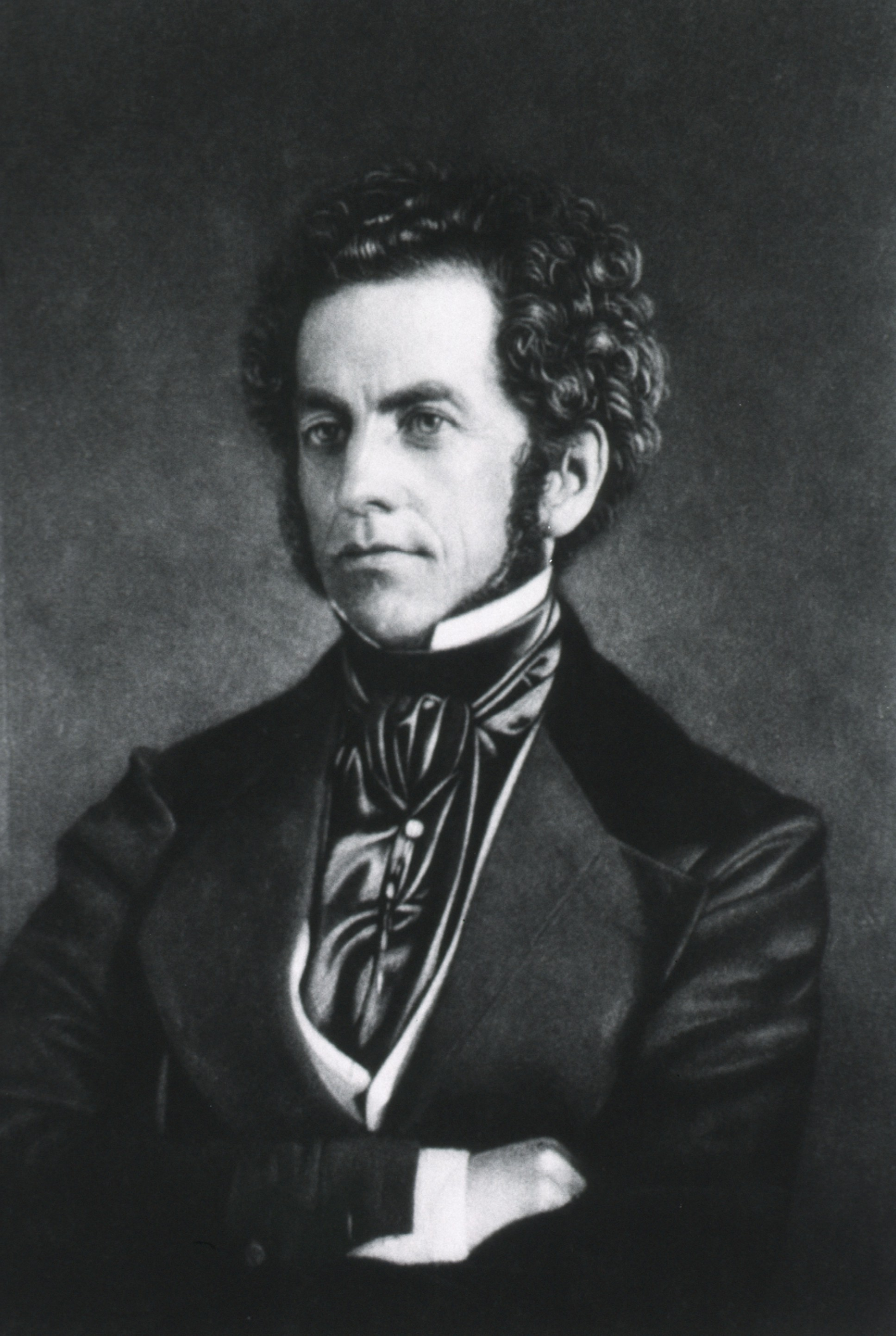
- Mütter in the 1840s
- Born: 9 March 1811; Richmond, Virginia, USA
- Died: 19 March 1859 (aged 48); Charleston, South Carolina, USA
- Burial place: Indian Hill Cemetery, Middletown, Middlesex County, Connecticut, USA
- Education: University of Pennsylvania, Jefferson Medical College
- Known for: American pioneer of Plastic Surgery, Mütter Museum
- Partner: Mary Wright Alsop Mütter
- Parent(s): John and Lucinda Mütter

Thomas Dent Mütter (March 9, 1811 – March 19, 1859) was an American surgeon born in Richmond, Virginia. Orphaned at the age of 8 and raised by a distant relative, he attended Hampden-Sydney College in Virginia (1824) and graduated with an MD from the University of Pennsylvania in 1831. Later he eventually took a position as an assistant to Dr. Thomas Harris at the Medical Institute of Jefferson College. At the age of 30, he became the Chair of Surgery at the Jefferson Medical College and held this position from 1841 to 1856, when he resigned because of gout and lung disease.

He operated on hundreds of patients to repair deformities and became the first surgeon in 1846 to administer ether anesthesia in Philadelphia. He is best known for the "Mütter Flap" which he used in order to treat burn victims; the grafting procedure is still used today.

== Early life and education ==
Thomas Dent Mütter was born on March 9, 1811, in Richmond, Virginia. He was the first child to John and Lucinda Mütter. His father was a first-generation Scottish immigrant. He ran a business as a factor and commission agent. Lucinda Mütter was connected to some of the most prestigious families in the South of the USA. She married Mütter at the age of fifteen and together they had two children, Thomas in 1811 and James in 1813. James died of illness in 1814 and Lucinda shortly after. John's business and health declined and he eventually left for Europe, leaving Thomas with his maternal grandmother, Frances Gillies. However, John died during the journey, and Frances died from gout some months later, leaving Thomas alone at age seven.

Patrick Gibson, John Mütter's business partner, convinced Robert W. Carter to take Thomas on as his ward. Carter selected for him the Llangollen School in Spotsylvania County, a grammar school that prepared boys to attend college. In 1826, he left to attend college at Virginia's Hampden-Sydney College. Mütter was written up for being distinguished in scholarship, industry, and behavior. However, during his early studies in college, he began to have attacks of intermittent fever and also developed biliary colic, a chronic condition. This diagnosis led Mütter to decide to study medicine, graduating nearly a decade later.

== Career ==
After he attended the Hampden-Sydney College in 1824 and graduated at the University of Pennsylvania, Mütter went to Paris, France, in 1831 to study under the French surgeon Guillaume Dupuytren, as well as a short period studying under surgeons in London, UK before returning to the United States in 1832. He opened his first medical office in Philadelphia.

In 1835, Thomas Harris invited Mütter to be an Assistant teacher of surgery at the Philadelphia Institute at a summer school of medicine. In 1836 he was elected as Fellow of the College of Physicians. In 1841 he was nominated Professor of Surgery at Jefferson Medical College. Moreover, Mütter was elected as a member to the American Philosophical Society in 1851 and Professor Emeritus in 1857.

Mütter's collected syllabi were published in 1850, six years before his retirement since he developed chronic gout and tuberculosis-related pulmonary hemorrhages.

=== Scientific accomplishments and plastic surgery ===
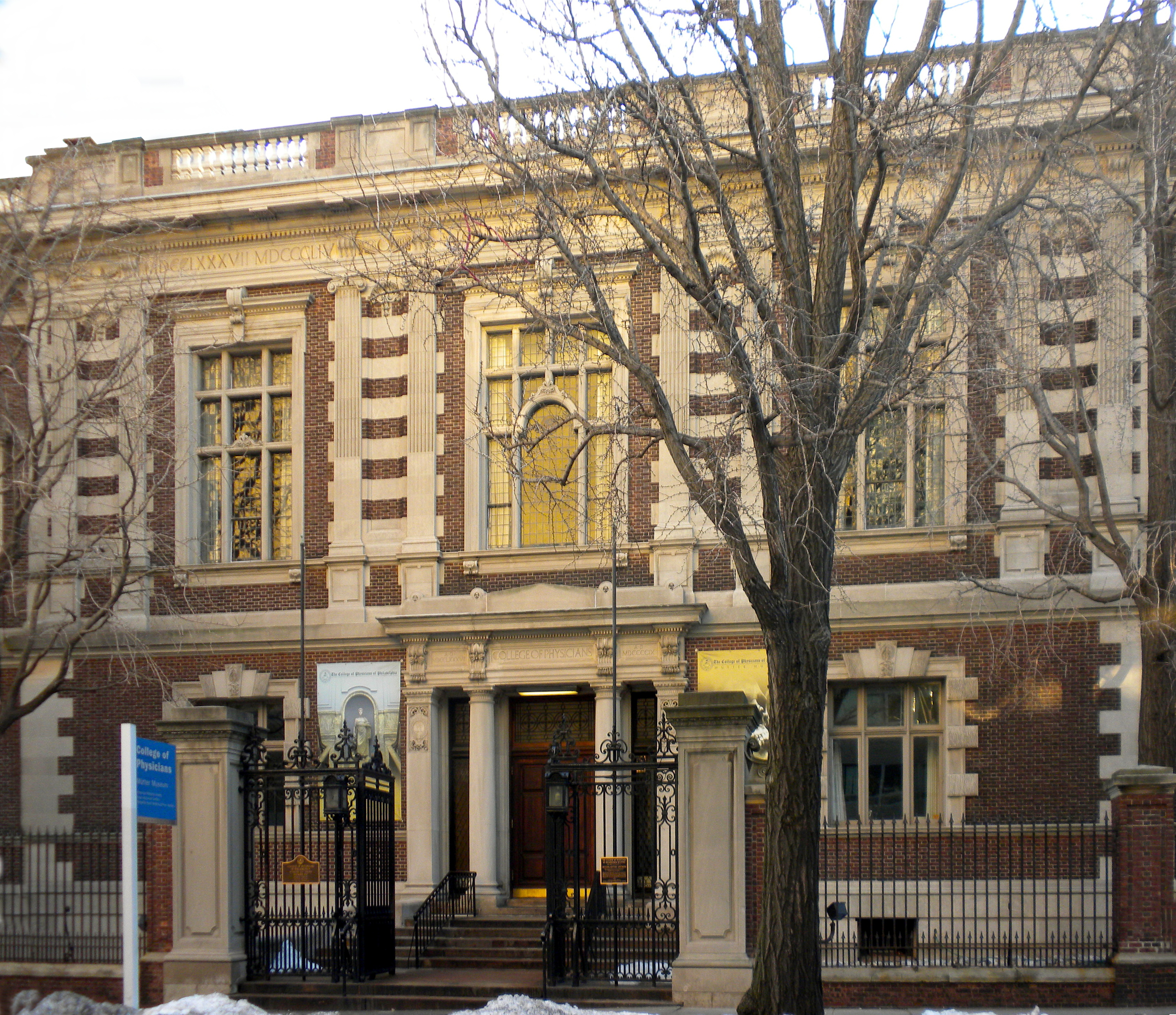
Mütter Museum

Mütter's main specialty was to help people who were "deformed", people that were categorized as monsters. Some of these people were born that way, others were born "normal", but their bodies had slowly turned them into "monsters", as tumors laid siege to parts of their bodies. For those patients, death was a risk they happily took in the surgical room for the chance to bring some level of peace and normality to their mangled faces or agonized bodies. In France, these kinds of surgeries Mütter specialized in were called Opérations plastiques, later called "Reconstructive surgery". Performing these surgeries, Mütter administered anesthesia to his patients. He was the first American surgeon to use it on patients.

During his life, Mütter collected artifacts relating to surgery, which he used to show his students when teaching. These ranged from illustrations and wax models to actual specimens of human anatomy. The collection formed the basis for the Mütter Museum, which opened in 1863 in Philadelphia. The museum has a collection of more than 25,000 specimens assembled by Mütter . Today, it includes a vertebra of John Wilkes Booth, a piece of Albert Einstein's brain, a cancerous growth from the mouth of President Grover Cleveland and the livers and plaster cast of the Siamese twins Chang and Eng.

== Selected publications ==
- A Lecture on Loxarthrus, or Club Foot, (1839)
- On Recent Improvements in Surgery : An Introductory Lecture to the Course on the Principles and Practice of Surgery, in Jefferson Medical College of Philadelphia, (1842)
- A Report on the Operations for Fissures of the Palatine Vault, (1843)
- ‌Cases of Deformity from Burns, Successfully Treated by Plastic Operations, (1843)
- Cases of Deformity of Various Kinds, Successfully Treated by Plastic Operations, (1844)
- Syllabus of the Course of Lectures on the Principles and Practice of Surgery : Delivered in the Jefferson Medical College, Philadelphia, (1855)

== Bibliography ==
- Cristin O'Keefe Aptowicz, "Dr Mütter's Marvels: A True Tale of Intrigue and Innovation at the Dawn of Modern Medicine" , (Gotham Books, 2014)
- Jennifer A. Baker, B.S., "Thomas Dent Mütter: the humble of a narrative of a surgeon, teacher, and curious collector", Thomas Jefferson University
- E. S. Harris, R. F. Morgan, "Thomas Dent Müttter, MD: early reparative surgeon"
- Joseph Pancoast "A Discourse Commemorative of the Late Professor T.D. Mütter", J Wilson Publisher
- "Mütter Museum Records, 1887-2006," Upenn.edu, 2022
