= College of Physicians of Philadelphia =

Oldest private medical society in the US

- The College of Physicians of Philadelphia Building
- U.S. National Register of Historic Places
- U.S. National Historic Landmark
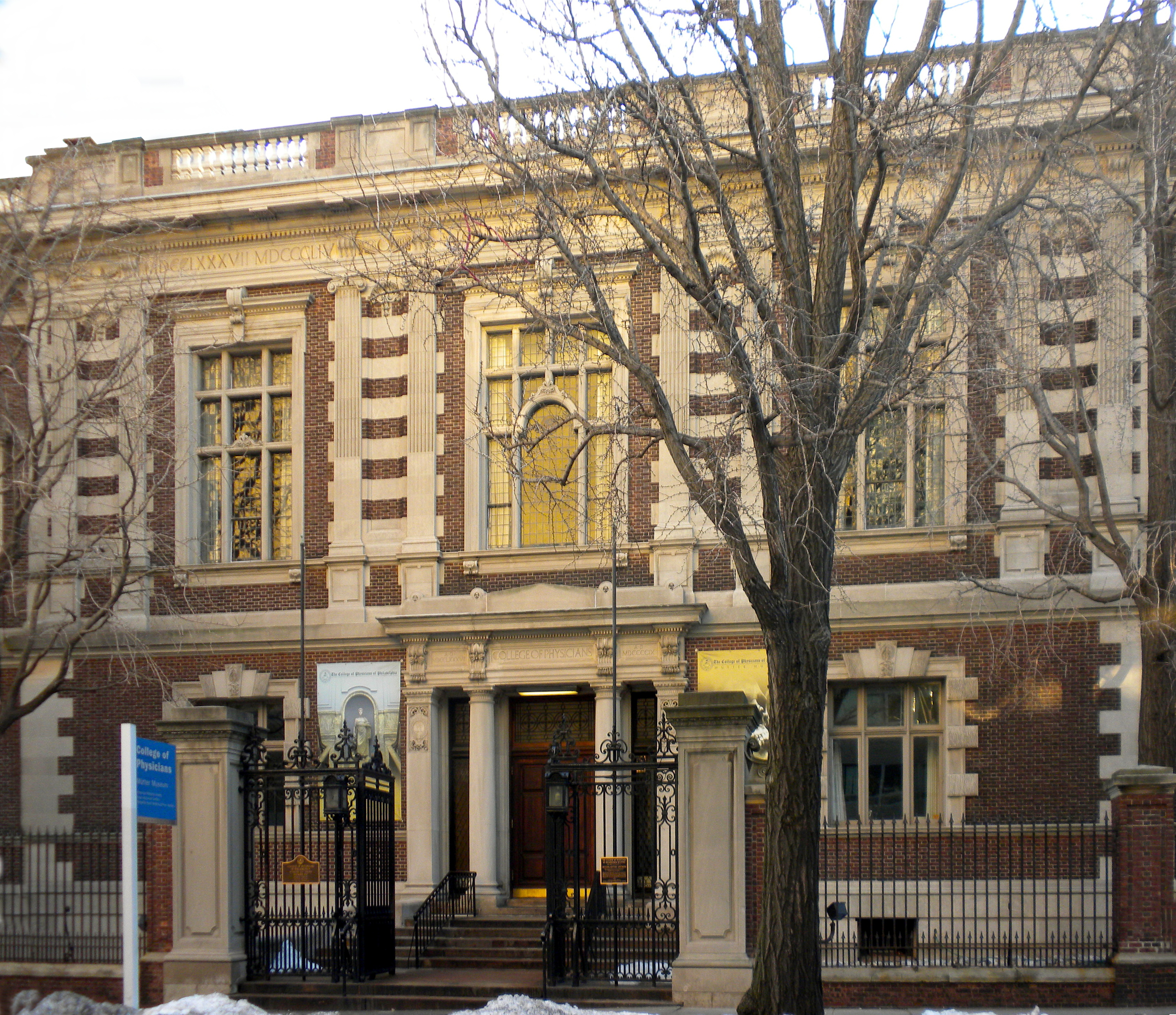
- 22nd Street facade

- Location within Philadelphia Location within Pennsylvania Location within the United States
- Location: 19 South 22nd Street, Philadelphia, Pennsylvania
- Coordinates: 39.95328°N 75.17636°W
- Area: <1 acre
- Built: 1909
- NRHP reference No.: 08001088

Significant dates
- Added to NRHP: October 6, 2008
- Designated NHL: October 6, 2008

The College of Physicians of Philadelphia is the oldest private medical society in the United States. Founded in 1787 by 24 Philadelphia physicians "to advance the Science of Medicine, and thereby lessen human misery, by investigating the diseases and remedies which are peculiar to our country" and to promote "order and uniformity in the practice of Physick," it has made important contributions to medical education and research. The college hosts the Mütter Museum, a gallery of 19th-century specimens, teaching models, instruments, and photographs, as well as the Historical Medical Library, which is one of the country's oldest medical libraries.

The College of Physicians of Philadelphia Building, designed by the firm of Cope & Stewardson and built in 1909, was designated a U.S. National Historic Landmark in October, 2008. It was also then listed on the National Register of Historic Places.

== Current programs ==
The college remains a private membership organization of physicians, whose members or "fellows" attend regular meetings on professional education and development. Starting in 1995 the C. Everett Koop Community Health Information Center has provided current information about medical and health topics to the general public. The Francis Clark Wood Institute for the History of Medicine, founded in 1976, supports seminars and conferences in the history of medicine and the Mütter Museum and the College Library specialize in the history of medicine rather than general medical topics. The Library and Museum are open to the public.

=== Museum ===
Founded by Thomas Dent Mütter in 1858 for medical research, the museum's contents include medical oddities, anatomical and pathological specimens, and antique medical equipment. Anatomical specimens include the conjoined liver of Siamese twins Chang and Eng Bunker; and a section of the brain of Charles J. Guiteau, who assassinated President Garfield. Medical instruments include a wooden stethoscope and Marie Curie's quartz-piezo electrometer

=== Historical Medical Library ===
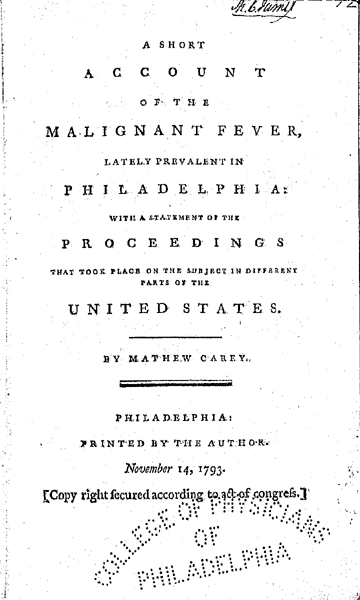
A 1793 text on Philadelphia's yellow fever epidemic, available online through the library

Their library was established in 1788 and served as Philadelphia's main medical library for over 150 years. It is now a research library specializing in the history of medicine. De sedibus et causis morborum (On the Seats and Causes of Disease) by Giambattista Morgagni was one of the first acquisitions of the library. This book, published in Venice in 1761, was given by Morgagni to John Morgan, a founding fellow of the college. The library's collection includes over 400 editions printed before 1500, known as incunabula, which is the second-largest collection of medical incunabula in the United States. Over 12,000 other rare books including De motu cordis (On the Motion of the Heart) (1628) by William Harvey and De humani corporis fabrica (On the Fabric of the Human Body) (1543) by Andreas Vesalius are in the collection.

In addition to its rare books and nineteenth- and twentieth-century collections, the College Library is notable for its manuscripts and archives. Within this collection are the college's own archives, the archives of other Philadelphia medical institutions, and letters, case books, and student notebooks that document the personal life and professional practice of doctors in the Philadelphia region and around the world.

The library is open to the public three days per week by appointment only.

As members of the Medical Heritage Library and the Philadelphia Area Consortium of Special Collections Libraries (PACSCL), the Library's medieval manuscripts and state medical journals have been digitized. Visitors can also view digital exhibitions created by the Library: https://www.cppdigitallibrary.org/.

== History of the college ==
Because of the Quaker tradition of philanthropy, Philadelphia became a leader in the development of medicine in the 18th century. America's first public hospital, founded 1752, and first medical school, founded 1765, were in Philadelphia, as were some of the earliest public health measures, including America's first public water supply in the 1790s. By 1783 Benjamin Rush, a signer of the Declaration of Independence, proposed a society similar to Royal College of Physicians in London. The first meeting was held on January 2, 1787. Within weeks the fellows were organizing a library and starting to produce a pharmacopoeia; within a year a series of scientific papers were being presented, which were collected in the Transactions of the College of Physicians starting in 1793.

The college's public health activism began in 1787 with statement on temperance sent to the Pennsylvania Legislature. In 1793, a yellow fever epidemic broke out in Philadelphia and the college proposed eleven public health measures to the mayor. When the epidemic returned in 1794 and 1797, the college organized the municipal response, proposing a city health law and a Board of Health with the authority to enforce quarantine. In 1841 the college encouraged the city to buy land along the Schuylkill River, to guarantee the purity of the city's drinking water, leading to the establishment of Fairmount Park, the nation's largest urban park. The College of Physicians’ humanitarian activism was reflected in its efforts to prevent the mentally ill from being executed.

The earliest meetings of the college were held at Fourth and Arch Streets but the growth of the library soon made that space inadequate. In 1791, the college moved to a room on the second floor of the American Philosophical Society’s new hall at Fifth and Chestnut Streets, in the group of public buildings surrounding Independence Hall. In the 1840s and 1850s the college moved twice, and in 1859 considered new quarters again when Thomas D. Mütter gave the college his pathology collection, and an endowment of $30,000 to support it, on the condition that the college build a fireproof building to house it within next five years.

Architect James H. Windrim designed a utilitarian two-story building that opened on March 4, 1863, at 13th and Locust Streets, at acost $40,858.28. In 1885 a third story was added and the interior was transformed into the style of a gentleman's club. By 1900 the growth of the library and museum collections forced consideration of another move. Andrew Carnegie contributed $50,000 in 1903 to start the building fund, and in 1906 he agreed to contribute the final $50,000 needed for construction. The cornerstone was laid on April 29, 1908, and the building dedicated on November 10, 1909. The completed cost was $289,266, excluding the furniture and finishing of the principal rooms.

== Building ==
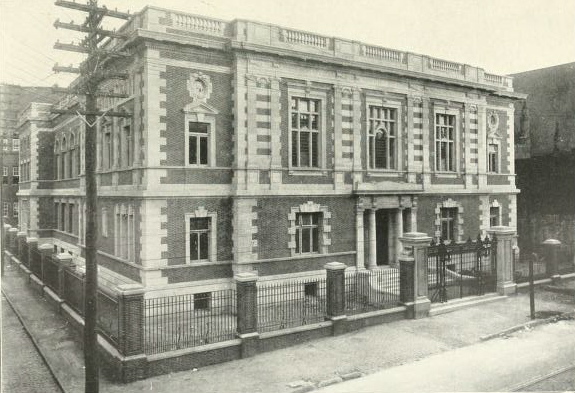
The college in 1909

The College of Physicians of Philadelphia Building is a two-story rectangular red brick structure with limestone trim that was completed in 1909. Many of its forms are drawn from London's Royal College of Physicians, designed by Robert Hooke and built in 1673–77. The building houses the library, a lecture hall, the museum, and offices. Three facades are highly decorated – the main facade on South 22nd Street facing west, the northern facade facing Ludlow Street, and the southern facade facing a courtyard. Three broad horizontal bands of limestone – along the basement, at the top of the first floor, and the balustrade – artistically unite all the facades.

The 22nd Street facade is most richly ornamented with a grand entrance behind a monumental gate and a wrought iron fence. The entrance is classically composed, flanked by Roman Doric columns with richly carved capitals. Outside this pair of columns are two pilasters, carved with the seal of the College of Physicians, that support a Doric entablature.

The interior is an opulent example of the Beaux-Arts architecture. A 30-foot-wide (9.1 m) octagonal rotunda, the main hall, and a rich formal marble stair form the central axis, with the main rooms branching off this axis. The stair, which dominates the first story, has a bronze railing and a niche holding a sculpture of Aesculapius, the god of healing. Mitchell Hall, originally called the Hall of Portraits, is a grand ceremonial hall measuring 71 by 48 feet (15 m). It holds much of the college's art collection, including works by Robert Vonnoh and William Merritt Chase. The Norris Room contains an unusual carved stone Gothic fireplace designed by Theophilus Parsons Chandler Jr. The fireplace was donated in 1885 by George William Childs, publisher of the Philadelphia Public Ledger, and originally built in the college's old Locust Street building. The Mütter Museum is a two-storied space surrounded by a gallery in the northeast corner of the building,

== Notable fellows ==
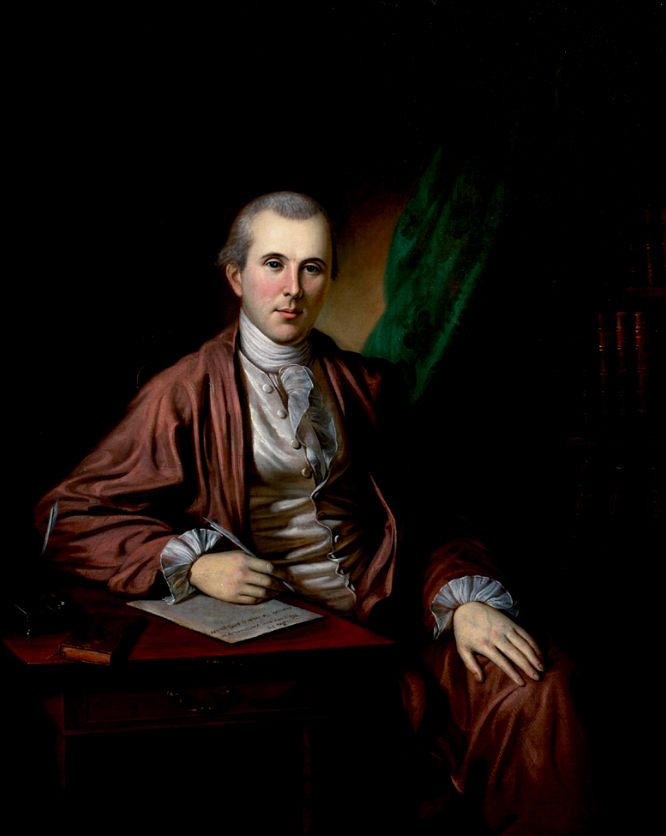
Benjamin Rush in 1783

=== Founders ===
Among the 24 founding fellows were:

- William Currie
- John Morris
- Benjamin Duffield
- Adam Kuhn
- John Redman, first president of the college
- Benjamin Rush, signer of the Declaration of Independence
- John Morgan, founder of America's first medical school
- Benjamin Say
- William Shippen Jr., the second Surgeon General of the Continental Army
- John Carson, original Trustee of the University of Pennsylvania
- Nathan Dorsey

=== Others ===
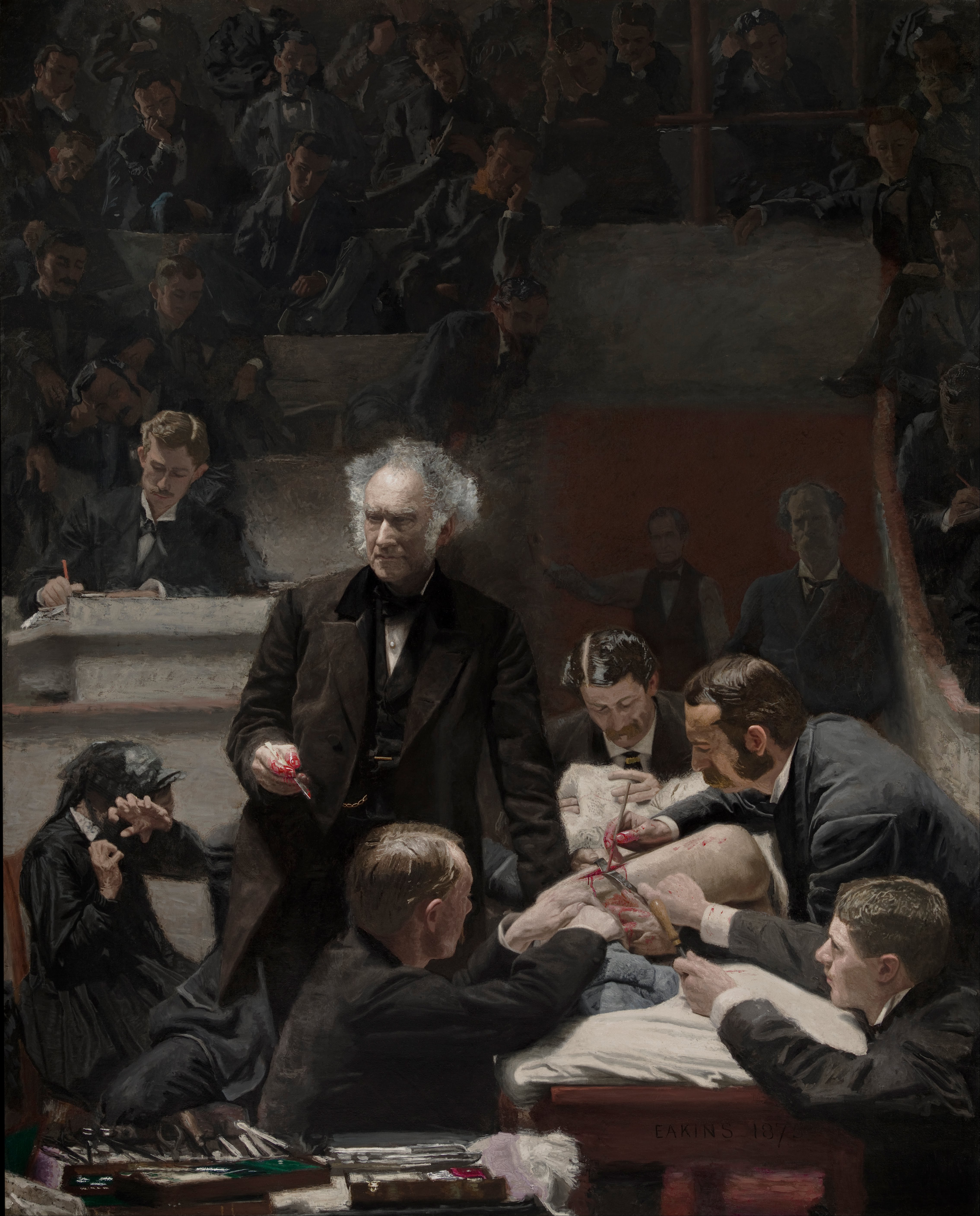
Samuel Gross in The Gross Clinic

- Franklin Bache
- Arthur Caplan
- Samuel D. Gross
- Joseph Leidy
- Joseph Lister, foreign fellow
- Silas Weir Mitchell, America's first neurologist
- Jane M. Oppenheimer
- Stephen G. Post
- William Ruschenberger, naval surgeon
- John Anderson Strong
- Caspar Wistar
- C. Everett Koop Former Surgeon General
- Elaine Zackai
- Lewis Coriell

== See also ==
- List of National Historic Landmarks in Philadelphia
- National Register of Historic Places listings in Center City, Philadelphia

== Sources ==
- College of Physicians of Philadelphia (1882). Charter, ordinances and by-laws of the College of physicians of Philadelphia: as amended November 1st, 1882. Philadelphia: Collins. p. 76.
- Susan Glassman; Bill Bolger; Patty Henry (December 2, 2002), National Historic Landmark Nomination: The College of Physicians of Philadelphia Building, National Archives and Records Administration
- Norman, Henry, J (1908). College of Physicians of Philadelphia. p. 62.
