= Ross Granville Harrison =

American biologist (1870–1959)

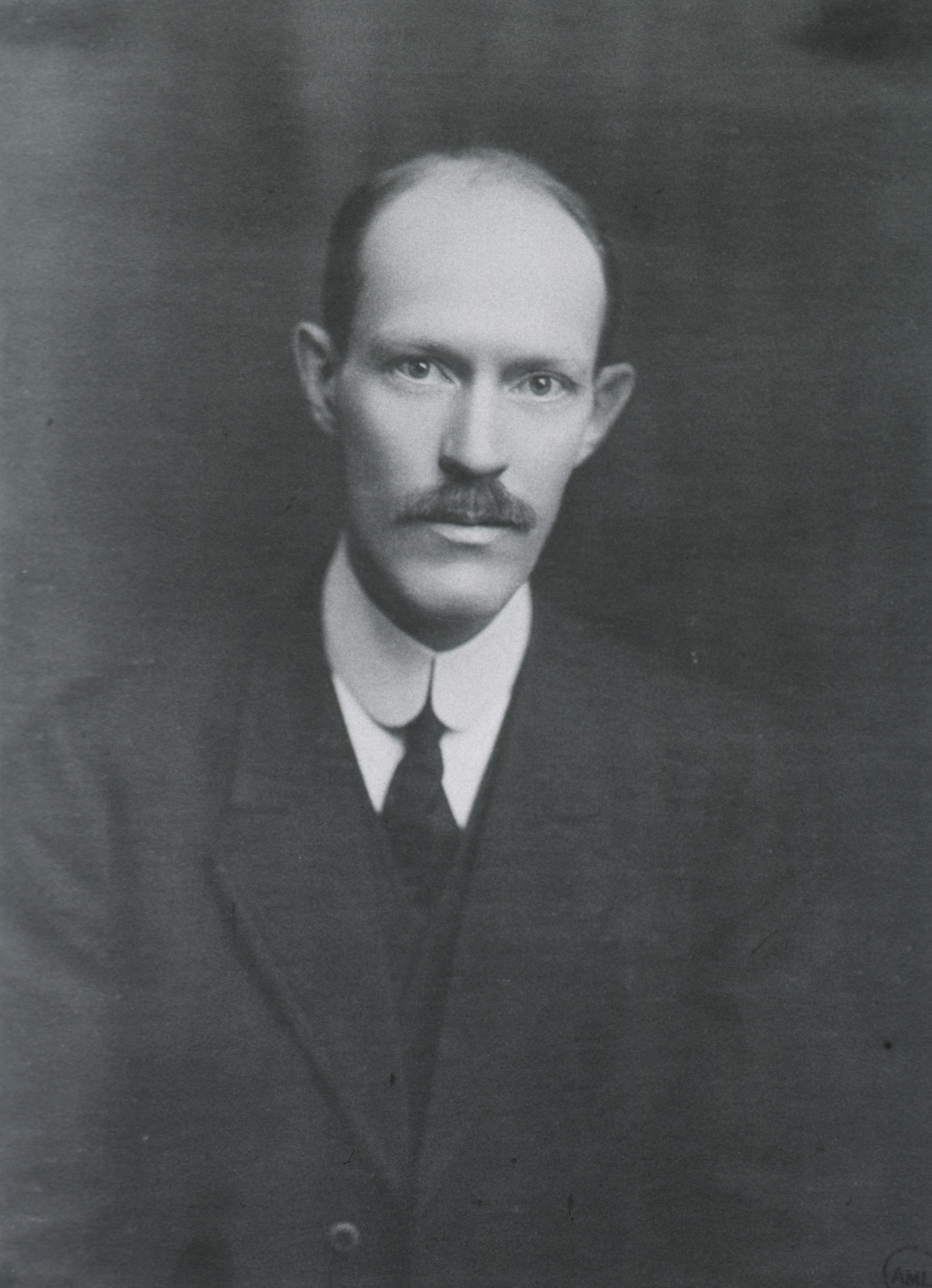
- Harrison in 1911
- Born: January 13, 1870; Germantown, Pennsylvania, United States
- Died: September 30, 1959 (aged 89); New Haven, Connecticut, United States
- Education: Johns Hopkins University (BA 1889, PhD 1894); University of Bonn (MD 1899)
- Known for: tissue culture
- Awards: Fellow of the Royal Society
- Scientific career
- Fields: biology and anatomy
- Workplaces: Bryn Mawr College(1894–1985); Yale (1907–1938)
- Doctoral students: John Spangler Nicholas

Ross Granville Harrison (January 13, 1870 – September 30, 1959) was an American biologist and anatomist credited for his pioneering work on animal tissue culture. His work also contributed to the understanding of embryonic development. Harrison studied in many places around the world and made a career as a university professor. He was also a member of many learned societies and received several awards for his contributions to anatomy and biology.

== Education ==
Harrison received his early schooling in Baltimore, where his family had moved from Germantown, Philadelphia. Announcing in his mid teens a resolve to study medicine, he entered Johns Hopkins University in 1886, receiving his BA degree in 1889 at the age of nineteen. In 1890, he worked as a laboratory assistant for the United States Fish Commission in Woods Hole, Massachusetts, studying the embryology of the oyster with his close friend E. G. Conklin and H. V. Wilson.

In 1891, he participated in a marine zoology field trip to the Chesapeake Zoological Laboratory in Jamaica. Attracted to the work of Moritz Nussbaum, he worked in Bonn, Germany during 1892–1893, 1895–1896, and 1898 and became an M.D. there in 1899. Harrison gained his Ph.D. in 1894 after courses in physiology with H. Newell Martin and morphology with William Keith Brooks. He devoted study to mathematics, astronomy and also the Latin and Greek classics.

== Career ==
Between his studies in Bonn, Harrison taught morphology at Bryn Mawr College with T. H. Morgan from 1894 to 1895. He was an instructor at Johns Hopkins University from 1896 to 1897 and became an associate at the university from 1897 to 1899. From 1899 until 1907, he was the associate professor of anatomy, teaching histology and embryology. By this time he had contributed more than twenty papers and made the acquaintance of many leading biologists. His work on tissue culture became very influential.

He then moved to New Haven to take up a post at Yale University, where he was Bronson Professor of Comparative Anatomy. He was made chair of zoology department in 1912, participating through to 1913 in a revitalisation and re-organisation of the several faculties of which he became a member. He undertook further studies at the United States Fish Commission in the early years of the century. In 1913 he was elected to the National Academy of Sciences and the American Philosophical Society. Harrison was instrumental in the 1913 opening of the university laboratory, Osborn Memorial Laboratory, and served as its director beginning in 1918. In 1914, Harrison was the Medical School's chief advisor on staffing. He was made the Sterling Professor of Biology in 1927 and kept these three titles until his retirement in 1938, when he was made Yale's Professor Emeritus.

== Other pursuits ==
Harrison pursued many things outside of his work in university. From 1904 to 1946, Harrison was the managing editor of the Journal of Experimental Zoology. He served as the ninth president of the Association of American Anatomists from 1911 to 1913, and joined the American Society of Naturalists in 1913. In 1924, Harrison joined the American Society of Zoologists and in 1933, he joined the Beaumont Medical Club. He was a member of Anatomische Gesellschaft ("Anatomical Society" in German) from 1934 to 1935 and became chair of section F for the American Association for Advancement of Science in 1936.

After his retirement from Yale, he was called upon several times as an advisor to the U.S. government and his organisational skills were of paramount importance in establishing links between scientists, the government, and the media. He was Chairman of the National Research Council from 1938 to 1946 and worked to help people with difficulties obtaining medicines such as penicillin. He was a member of the Science Committee of the National Resources Planning Board in 1938, and chairman of the Committee on Civil Service Improvement and a member of the Sixth Pacific Science Congress in 1939. He was awarded many prizes, such as the John Scott Medal and Premium of the City of Philadelphia in 1925 and the John J. Carty Medal of the National Academy of Sciences in 1947. He also served on the board of trustees for Science Service, now known as Society for Science & the Public, from 1938 to 1956. From 1946 to 1947, Harrison was a member of the Society for the Study of Development and Growth.

Harrison gave a Croonian Lecture in 1933: The origin and development of the nervous system studied by the methods of experimental embryology. He was elected a Foreign Member of the Royal Society in 1940. He gave the 1948-49 Silliman Memorial Lecture: Organization and Development of the Embryo, published posthumously in 1969.

== Studies in embryology ==
Harrison successfully cultured frog neuroblasts in a lymph medium, proving that nerve fibers develop without a preexisting bridge or chain and that tissues can be grown outside of the body. He published the results of his studies in 1907. This part of Harrison's research was the first step toward current research on precursor and stem cells. While Harrison himself didn't develop this area of research any further, he encouraged others to. He was considered for a Nobel prize for his work on nerve-cell outgrowth, which helped form the modern functional understanding of the nervous system, and he contributed to surgical tissue transplant technique.

During the first world war, Harrison studied embryology and the symmetries of development. By means of the dissection of embryos followed by transplantation and rotation of the limb bud he demonstrated that the main axes of the developing limb are determined independently and at slightly different times, determination of the anteroposterior (anterior-posterior) axis preceding that of the dorsoventral (dorsal-ventral) axis. Harrison dissected Ambystoma puncatatum (salamander) embryos and transplanted limb buds to determine whether the limbs developed independently or according to instructions from host cells. When the limb buds were transplanted in halves or doubled, they still developed into normal limbs. Harrison concluded that the information from the host (the surrounding embryo cells) directed the cells to develop normally even though they were transplanted in halves or doubles. Therefore, the limb buds were all equipotential, meaning they all developed the same way, and the tissue around the limb buds determined their dorsoventral orientation. However, when a left limb was put on the right side of the body, a left limb grew anyway despite its relocation. The same pattern occurred when a right disk was placed on the left side of the body—a right limb grew. Harrison also transplanted inverted limbs. When a left disk was inverted, it grew a right limb (and vice versa). Harrison then concluded by this data that the buds determined anteroposterior orientation independent of the surrounding host tissue. Harrison's research lead him to assume that the development of limbs is not determined exclusively by the limb buds or by the environment, but that both of these factors influence how an embryo develops. Harrison published the results of this study in 1921 in the Journal of Experimental Zoology in a paper titled "On relations of symmetry in transplanted limbs".

== Personal life ==
Harrison married Ida Lange (1874-1967) in Altona, Germany on January 9, 1896, and they had a family of five children. One of them is the cartographer Richard Edes Harrison. The first world war was not a happy time for Harrison, with his pacifist leanings and his German wife and studies, but he persevered with embryology, working upon the symmetries of development.

Although a keen morphogeneticist and an admirer of Goethe, Harrison himself did not philosophise much in his papers and, being somewhat reserved and diffident in his social dealings despite his warm feelings for his students' attainment, did not enjoy lecturing but chiefly confined himself to organisation, publication (his textbook illustrations have been highly praised) and patient experiment. He remained a keen walker all his life and is presumed to have died in New Haven.

== See also ==
- Alexander Gurwitsch
- Hans Spemann
- Paul Alfred Weiss
