= Upacicalcet =

Chemical compound

Clinical data
- Trade names: Upasita

Legal status
- Legal status: Rx in Japan

Identifiers
- IUPAC name: (2S)-2-Amino-3-[(3-chloro-2-methyl-5-sulfophenyl)carbamoylamino]propanoic acid
- CAS Number: 1333218-50-0
- PubChem CID: 53374467
- ChemSpider: 71115962
- UNII: 5C1222PBE2
- KEGG: D12918

Chemical and physical data
- Formula: C_{11}H_{14}ClN_{3}O_{6}S
- Molar mass: 351.76 g·mol^{−1}
- 3D model (JSmol): Interactive image
- SMILES: CC1=C(C=C(C=C1Cl)S(=O)(=O)O)NC(=O)NC[C@@H](C(=O)O)N
- InChI: InChI=1S/C11H14ClN3O6S/c1-5-7(12)2-6(22(19,20)21)3-9(5)15-11(18)14-4-8(13)10(16)17/h2-3,8H,4,13H2,1H3,(H,16,17)(H2,14,15,18)(H,19,20,21)/t8-/m0/s1; Key:LHEYGVSDVBEYQF-QMMMGPOBSA-N

Upacicalcet is a drug used to treat secondary hyperparathyroidism (SHPT) - a disease of the parathyroid gland - in dialysis patients. It was approved as Upasita in Japan in June 2021. The drug is given intravenously. The active ingredient is used in the form of its sodium salt.

== Mechanism of action ==
Upacicalcet is a calcimimetic, a substance which acts at the calcium sensing receptor of parathyroid cells and thereby inhibiting parathyroid hormone secretion. Parathyroid hormone regulates the calcium concentration in the blood plasma to maintain calcium homeostasis in the body tissues ("calcium balance").

== Clinical studies ==
Efficacy and safety were investigated in a multicenter, randomized, double-blind, placebo-controlled phase 3 study in 154 SHPT patients. Upacicalcet or placebo was given three times a week at the end of hemodialysis. The doses were then adjusted every three weeks during the 24-week treatment period in order to maintain the serum level of intact parathyroid hormone (iPTH) in the concentration range recommended by the Japanese guideline. The primary endpoint was the percentage of patients who achieved mean iPTH levels of 60–240 pg/ml by weeks 22–24.

The primary endpoint for upacicalcet was significantly higher than for placebo (67.0% vs. 8.0%). Upacicalcet significantly reduced the iPTH and cCa values (corrected calcium levels) compared to placebo. No statistically significant difference between the groups was observed for serum phosphate, but it tended to decrease in that in the upacicalcet group. Hypocalcemia did not occur in either group.
