= Milk-alkali syndrome =

Symptoms due to excess consumption of calcium and alkali

- Other names: Calcium-alkali syndrome
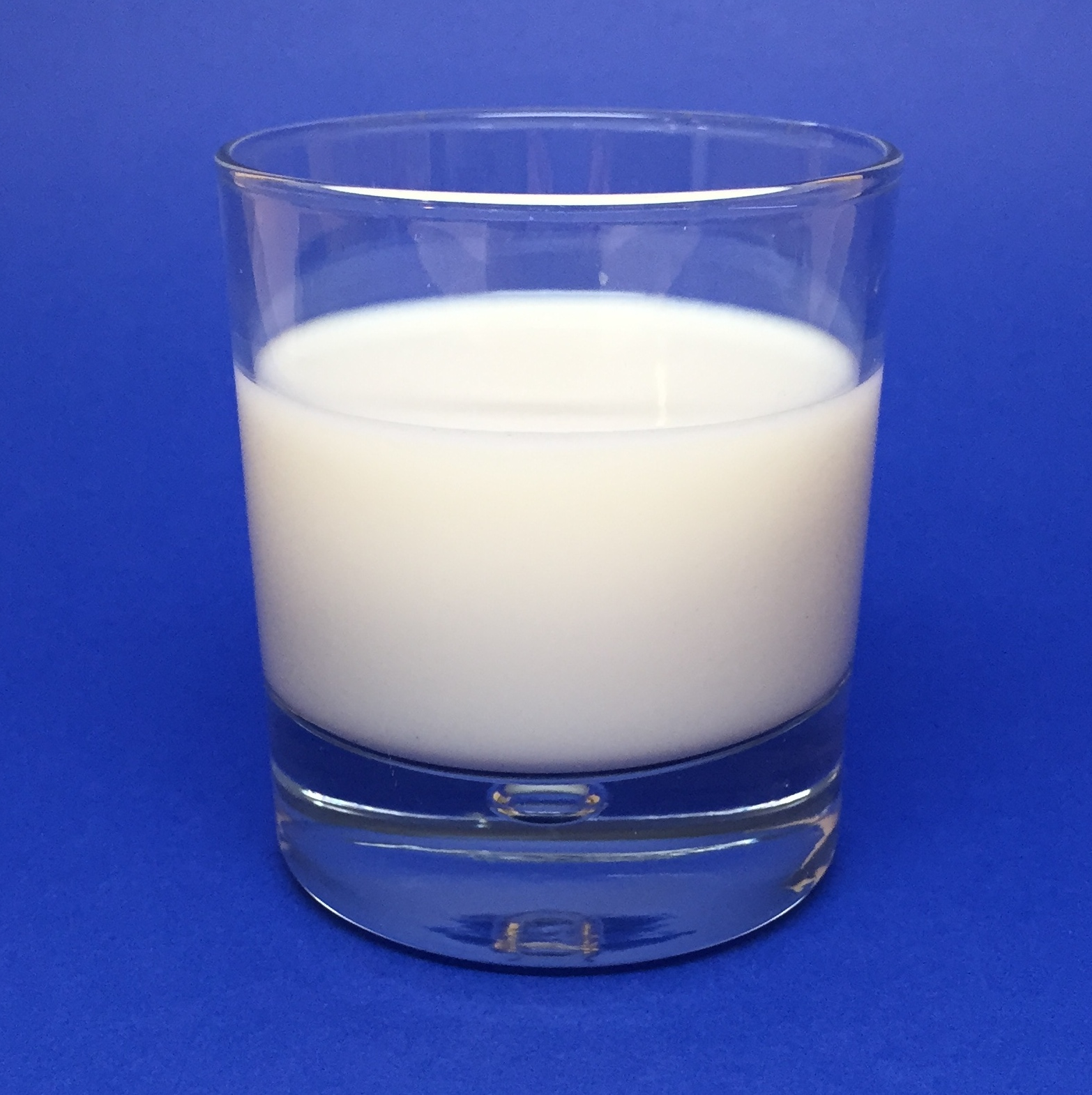
- Symptoms: Vertigo, confusion, apathy, nausea and vomiting, anorexia, tremors, psychosis, myalgia, polyuria, renal calcifications, and pruritus.
- Complications: Renal failure, death.
- Causes: Intake of large amounts of calcium and absorbable alkali.
- Risk factors: Older age; acute and chronic renal failure; bulimia nervosa; use of certain drugs such as thiazide, NSAIDs, and ACE inhibitors.
- Diagnostic method: Based on physical symptoms, laboratory findings, ECG, and X-ray (to exclude other causes of hypercalcemia).
- Differential diagnosis: Other disorders that can cause hypercalcemia such as: hyperparathyroidism, malignancies, hyperthyroidism, sarcoidosis, and other malignancies.
- Prevention: Decrease calcium intake (1.2-1.5 g/daily for individuals with risk factors for MAS).
- Treatment: Withdrawal of the offending agent, hydration, hemodialysis (in extreme cases).

Milk-alkali syndrome (MAS), also referred to as calcium-alkali syndrome, is the third most common cause of elevated blood calcium levels (hypercalcemia). Milk-alkali syndrome is characterized by hypercalcemia, metabolic alkalosis, and acute kidney injury.

Milk-alkali syndrome can be caused by the excessive intake of calcium and absorbable alkali. Sources of calcium and alkali include dietary supplements taken for the prevention of osteoporosis or hyperparathyroidism and antacids taken for peptic ulcer disease. Common acute symptoms of milk-alkali syndrome include nausea and vomiting, dry mouth, confusion, lethargy, and distaste for milk. If left untreated, milk-alkali syndrome may lead to kidney failure or even death.

== Signs and symptoms ==
The signs and symptoms of milk-alkali syndrome can develop after only a few days and up to several months following the initial ingestion of absorbable calcium and alkali. However, the severity of signs and symptoms of milk-alkali syndrome is largely dependent upon the duration and quantity of calcium and alkali ingested.

Acute milk-alkali syndrome is characterized by several biochemical alterations, mainly alkalosis, hypochloremia, hypokalemia, and hypercalcemia. In the acute phase of milk-alkali syndrome (Cope syndrome), the first symptoms of toxicity are nausea, vomiting, anorexia, headache, dizziness, vertigo, apathy, weakness, confusion, irritability, dry mouth, and repulsion to milk. In individuals with chronic milk-alkali syndrome (Burnett syndrome), symptoms may include muscle aches, psychosis, tremor, polyuria (producing large volumes of dilute urine), polydipsia (intense thirst), pruritus (itchy sensation on skin), band keratopathy and abnormal calcifications. These abnormal calcium deposits often collect metastatically in the body, including throughout the periarticular tissue, subcutaneous tissue, central nervous system, liver, kidneys, adrenal, bones, and lungs. If ingestion of calcium and alkali is continued, neurologic symptoms such as memory loss, personality changes, lethargy, stupor, and coma will persistently develop over time, as a result of the extreme hypercalcemia and electrolyte imbalances.

People with milk-alkali syndrome commonly show signs of renal dysfunction, a hallmark symptom of milk-alkali syndrome, at early stages of disease progression. Several lab test results, such as elevated blood urea nitrogen (BUN) and elevated creatinine, are illustrative of azotemia and kidney impairment. Histologically, the kidneys of individuals with milk-alkali syndrome have been shown to have "complete glomerulus hyalinization, thickening of the Bowman's capsule, tubular atrophy, vascular changes, and diffuse lymphocytic infiltration."

Other laboratory tests, such as measuring serum bicarbonate, pH, 1,25-OH vitamin D, and parathyroid hormone (PTH) can show signs of milk-alkali syndrome. Specifically, bicarbonate and pH would be elevated while 1,25-OH vitamin D and PTH would be suppressed.

== Causes ==
Milk-alkali syndrome is caused by ingesting excessive amounts of both calcium (usually in the form of dietary supplements such as calcium carbonate, which is commonly taken to prevent or treat osteoporosis) and absorbable alkali (as are found in antacid drugs).

Presently, consumption of extensively large amounts of calcium carbonate has replaced the over-ingestion of milk products, or milk and bicarbonate, as the most prominent cause of MAS. Excessive consumption of calcium generally means taking in more than 4 to 5 g of calcium carbonate every day. This can be attributed to the greater availability of over-the-counter calcium carbonate supplements to treat osteoporosis and dyspepsia, as well as the growing awareness among consumers of the potential health benefits of calcium intake. Calcium carbonate is also often prescribed to people with chronic kidney disease for the prevention of secondary hyperparathyroidism and to people receiving prolonged corticosteroid therapy that may lead to bone loss, putting them at a higher risk of calcium over-consumption and developing MAS.

Other drugs reported to be associated with the development of MAS include thiazide diuretics, which cause increased reabsorption of calcium in the kidneys; resulting hypovolemia can lead to contraction alkalosis. Angiotensin-converting enzyme (ACE) inhibitors and non-steroidal anti-inflammatory drugs (NSAIDs) are also drugs associated with MAS because they decrease glomerular filtration rate (GFR) and thus reduce calcium excretion. Taking medications such as aluminum hydroxide and magnesium hydroxide, which are absorbable alkali, can also contribute to MAS in those who already consume a large amount of calcium.

Pregnant individuals have an increased risk for developing MAS due to hyperemesis (which can cause hypovolemia) and enhanced gastrointestinal calcium absorption as a result of higher levels of prolactin or placental lactose signaling (resulting in hypercalcemia). Calcium carbonate is also commonly used in pregnant individuals to treat acid reflux, further putting them at risk for overconsumption of calcium and developing MAS.

== Mechanism ==
The mechanism of how milk-alkali syndrome develops from ingesting too much of calcium and absorbable alkali is still unclear. However, it is well known that MAS is usually associated with a triad of symptoms that include hypercalcemia, alkalosis, and acute kidney injury. In general, milk-alkali syndrome starts with excess calcium levels in the body (hypercalcemia), which causes the body's pH to increase (become more alkaline) resulting in metabolic alkalosis and ultimately contributes to a decrease in renal function.

Factors involved in the development of hypercalcemia include excess intestinal absorption of calcium, saturation of the bone's buffering capacity for calcium, decreased renal excretion, and abnormal vitamin D metabolism. Underlying kidney disease is a risk factor for MAS, but even people with healthy kidneys can develop the syndrome.

For a healthy individual, if calcium levels are high, the kidneys will decrease its production of calcitriol (active vitamin D) by reducing the hydroxylation of calcidiol (inactive vitamin D); lower calcitriol levels means a lower rate of calcium absorption in the small intestine, which eventually offsets the elevated calcium levels. However, excessive ingestion of calcium of more than 10-15 g per day has been reported to cause calcium levels too high for renal calcitriol suppression to control, resulting in net calcium absorption that ultimately causes hypercalcemia.

Hypercalcemia affects the kidneys in multiple ways that altogether contributes to hypovolemia. Prolonged hypercalcemia can decrease glomerular filtration rate (GFR) via vasoconstriction, reduce creatinine clearance, and eventually cause renal insufficiency. Hypercalcemia also causes natriuresis by blocking the Na-K-Cl cotransporter (NKCC) in the medullary thick ascending limb of the loop of Henle, leading increased sodium excretion followed by water excretion that leads to hypovolemia. Additionally, hypercalcemia can decrease the reabsorption of water in the kidney's collecting ducts by suppressing antidiuretic hormone (ADH) receptors, contributing to more hypovolemia. Hypercalcemia also results in lower parathyroid hormone (PTH) levels via a negative feedback loop, in which calcium-sensing receptors in the PTH gland are activated by the elevated calcium levels to inhibit PTH production, thus decreasing renal reabsorption of calcium.

Hypovolemia then leads to metabolic alkalosis (increase in blood pH) by stimulating bicarbonate reabsorption in order to maintain extracellular volume. In summary, the symptoms of alkalosis is the net result of over-consumption of absorbable alkali, hypercalcemia-induced hypovolemia, and impaired glomerular filtration rate. Alkalosis, in turn, increases calcium-reabsorption from the distal tubules of the nephron, thus exacerbating the hypercalcemia and hypovolemia.

Altogether, these result in a cycle of hypercalcemia, alkalosis, and renal injury characteristic of MAS.

== Diagnosis ==
Prior to an official diagnosis of milk-alkali syndrome, other causes of hypercalcemia must be ruled out. Other causes of hypercalcemia can include elevated vitamin D levels, hyperthyroidism, and hyperparathyroidism.

Physical examination

Symptoms such as vertigo, confusion, apathy, nausea and vomiting, anorexia, tremors, psychosis, myalgia, polyuria, abnormal calcifications such as renal calcifications, and pruritus could be observed in people.

Lab work

Lab work must be done to diagnose milk-alkali syndrome. Lab workup includes serum calcium levels, parathyroid hormone (PTH), phosphorus, creatinine, blood urea nitrogen (BUN), magnesium, and vitamin D levels. Primary hyperparathyroidism has to be excluded. Diagnosis is made by looking at past medical history and laboratory studies.

1. Serum calcium levels: high serum calcium levels.
2. PTH: low serum PTH levels are indicative of MAS. Low serum PTH levels also exclude primary hyperthyroidism.
3. Phosphorus: low serum phosphorus levels due to low PTH.
4. Creatinine and BUN: high levels can indicate severity of renal damage.
5. Magnesium: serum magnesium levels are low as hypercalcemia inhibits mg^2+ reabsorption in the renal tubules.
6. Vitamin D levels: low vitamin D levels are found. Normal vitamin D levels eliminate primary hypercalcemia.

ECG intervals

Electrocardiograms (ECG)

An ECG can also be used to diagnose MAS. The following findings related to hypercalcemia could appear on an ECG:

1. Short QT interval: most commonly seen as short OoT or OaT changes.
2. Prolongation of PR and QRS intervals.
3. Increased Amplitude of QRS complex.
4. Osborn wave
5. Short ST segment.

Radiology

Chest x-rays can help exclude any malignancy or sarcoidosis when evaluating for hypercalcemia.

== Prevention ==
Increasing education in both people and clinicians surrounding milk-alkali syndrome can help prevent the disease. Over recent years, people have become more aware of the benefits of calcium and how to access it, leading to a consequential rise in cases of milk-alkali syndrome. It is crucial that people are educated by their healthcare provider(s) about how hypercalcemia can develop and the hallmark symptoms to monitor for. Often unknown to the person, calcium can come from many different dietary sources in addition to self- or prescribed-supplementation. Unfortunately, this can lead to the intake of amounts of calcium that exceed recommended doses, causing harmful effects. Particularly in persons with any degree of renal disease, supplementation of calcium can more easily result in deadly hypercalcemia and alkalosis. Generally, the daily intake of less than 2 grams of calcium is considered to be safe. Prior to starting any calcium supplementation, it is recommended to discuss the individualized calcium requirements of the person. If a person begins a calcium supplementation regimen, they should be educated on the common signs and symptoms of hypercalcemia and milk-alkali syndrome, as well as how to reverse the syndrome by discontinuing the offending agent and seeking medical attention.

== Treatment ==
For mild cases of MAS, the only intervention needed is to withdraw the offending agent. By having the person stop taking any calcium supplements and any other alkali agents they have been taking rapidly corrects hypercalcemia and alkalosis in MAS.

In severe cases, hospitalization may be required to manage this syndrome. Withholding calcium and initiating IV fluids such as saline to correct hypovolemia. The initial rate of infusion is generally around 200-300 mL/h in people not experiencing edema then it is adjusted to maintain urine output of 100 - 150 mL/h. However, the rate is variable depending on the individual's age, renal status, comorbidities, and the severity of hypercalcemia.

Furosemide can be used to treat hypercalcemia as it induces caliuresis (excreting calcium in the urine). Standard practice of adequate rehydration and electrolyte monitoring should be used to avoid alkalosis and renal insufficiency.

If kidney failure is advanced then treatment for that is required, namely chronic dialysis.

Calcimimetic agents may be necessary, e.g. Cinacalcet.

== Outcomes ==
In mild cases of milk-alkali syndrome, full recovery is expected and reduction to renal function is reversible. However, in severe cases that are chronic, permanent kidney failure or death may result. Long term consumption of large amounts of calcium supplementation associated with milk-alkali syndrome has also been linked to adverse cardiovascular outcomes. It was found that over supplementation of calcium can lead to an increased risk for myocardial infarction and vascular calcification.

== Epidemiology ==
In the early years after the discovery of milk-alkali syndrome, the prevalence of the disease among people treated with Sippy's treatment varied from 2% to 18%. The wide range was attributed to the differing amounts of alkali absorbed among people. In the 1900s, the mortality rate of people with milk-alkali syndrome was found to be 4.4%.

The use of milk and alkali to treat gastric ulcers greatly contributed to the development of milk-alkali syndrome in people but the incidence of milk-alkali syndrome greatly diminished when the true cause of most gastric ulcers was identified and drugs other than antacids were developed to treat heartburn, such as acid-reducing drugs like H_{2}-receptor antagonists or proton pump inhibitors. These new drugs replaced Sippy's diet treatment for peptic ulcers. However, the incidence of milk-alkali syndrome has increased again since the 1990s due to increased osteoporosis awareness and the preventative routine use of calcium supplements. The consumption of calcium supplementation in today's society, mostly to prevent osteoporosis, has aided in the resurgence of milk-alkali syndrome and has sparked conversation about changing the name of milk-alkali syndrome to calcium alkali syndrome as it more accurately reflects the cause of this syndrome. Currently, milk-alkali syndrome is the third most common cause of people hospitalized with high blood calcium, after hyperparathyroidism and cancer.

In regards to populations at risk, there has been a shift in the condition's demographic over time. Previously, milk-alkali syndrome was predominantly seen amongst males with ulcers. As new treatments for peptic ulcers arose, there was change in the causation of hypercalcemia. Presently, individuals who are at a higher risk of developing milk-alkali syndrome are pregnant or postmenopausal individuals and the elderly.

== History ==
Milk-alkali syndrome is an illness that is characterized by hypercalcaemia, kidney damage, and metabolic alkalosis. This syndrome was discovered in the early 1900s when people began experiencing adverse effects from Bertrand Sippy's gastric ulcer treatment consisting of milk and alkali. Sippy prescribed patients with ulcers milk and alkali, on the theory that ulcers were caused by excessive gastric acid. Further research by Cuthbert Cope and Charles H. Burnett revealed varying degrees of milk-alkali syndrome. Cope identified an acute phase which was named Cope's Syndrome while Burnett described a more severe chronic form which was named Burnett's Syndrome. However, both the acute and chronic form of this illness involve renal impairment which is a key contributor to the hypercalcemia seen in people with MAS. Cope and Burnett believe that the kidney damage caused by ingesting high amounts of calcium and alkali occurs first which subsequently makes removal of calcium from the body difficult.
