= NPS-2143 =

Chemical compound

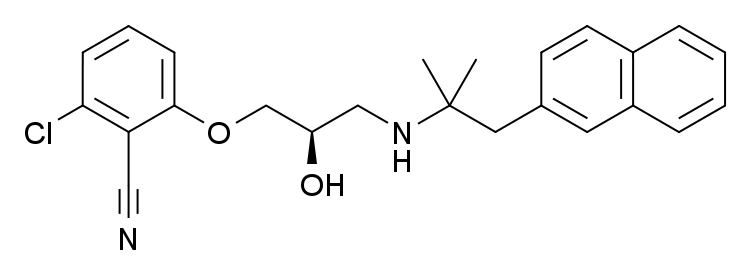

Identifiers
- IUPAC name: 2-chloro-6-[(2R)-3-([1,1-dimethyl-2-(2-naphthalenyl)ethyl]amino)-2-hydroxypropoxy]benzonitrile
- CAS Number: 284035-33-2; hydrochloride: 324523-20-8
- PubChem CID: 6918446
- IUPHAR/BPS: 716
- ChemSpider: 5293643
- UNII: Z25PJ77W7V; hydrochloride: U48SZ6EBB3
- CompTox Dashboard (EPA): DTXSID10426075

Chemical and physical data
- Formula: C_{24}H_{25}ClN_{2}O_{2}
- Molar mass: 408.93 g·mol^{−1}
- 3D model (JSmol): Interactive image
- SMILES: N#Cc2c(Cl)cccc2OCC(O)CNC(C)(C)Cc3ccc1ccccc1c3
- InChI: InChI=1S/C24H25ClN2O2/c1-24(2,13-17-10-11-18-6-3-4-7-19(18)12-17)27-15-20(28)16-29-23-9-5-8-22(25)21(23)14-26/h3-12,20,27-28H,13,15-16H2,1-2H3/t20-/m1/s1; Key:PZUJQWHTIRWCID-HXUWFJFHSA-N

NPS-2143 (SB-262,470A) is a calcilytic drug which acts as an antagonist at the Calcium-sensing receptor (CaSR), and consequently stimulates release of parathyroid hormone. Calcilytic drugs have been researched as potential treatments for osteoporosis, and as the first such compound developed, NPS-2143 is still widely used in research into the CaSR receptor as well as design of newer calcilytic agents.

== See also ==
- Cinacalcet
