= C24H26N2O2 =

The molecular formula C_{24}H_{26}N_{2}O_{2} (molar mass: 374.47 g/mol, exact mass: 374.1994 u) may refer to:

- Carmoxirole
- Evocalcet
- Furanylfentanyl
