= Tertiary hyperparathyroidism =

Tertiary Hyperparathyroidism
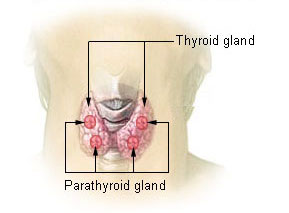
- Thyroid and parathyroid
- Specialty: Endocrinology
- Symptoms: None, kidney stones, weakness, depression, bone pains, confusion, increased urination
- Complications: Osteoporosis
- Usual onset: 50 to 60
- Types: Primary, secondary, tertiary
- Causes: Tertiary: parathyroid adenoma, multiple benign tumors, parathyroid cancer, parathyroid hyperplasia, growth of parathyroid tissue, secondary hyperparathyroidism
- Diagnostic method: High blood calcium and high PTH levels
- Treatment: Surgery, intravenous normal saline
- Frequency: ~2 per 1,000

Tertiary hyperparathyroidism is a condition involving the overproduction of the hormone, parathyroid hormone, produced by the parathyroid glands. The parathyroid glands are involved in monitoring and regulating blood calcium levels and respond by either producing or ceasing to produce parathyroid hormone.

Anatomically, these glands are located in the neck, para-lateral to the thyroid gland, which does not have any influence in the production of parathyroid hormone. Parathyroid hormone is released by the parathyroid glands in response to low blood calcium circulation. Persistent low levels of circulating calcium are thought to be the catalyst in the progressive development of adenoma, in the parathyroid glands resulting in primary hyperparathyroidism. While primary hyperparathyroidism is the most common form of this condition, secondary and tertiary are thought to result due to chronic kidney disease (CKD). Estimates of CKD prevalence in the global community range from 11 to 13% which translate to a large portion of the global population at risk of developing tertiary hyperparathyroidism.

Tertiary hyperparathyroidism was first described in the late 1960s and had been misdiagnosed as primary prior to this. Unlike primary hyperparathyroidism, the tertiary form presents as a progressive stage of resolved secondary hyperparathyroidism with biochemical hallmarks that include elevated calcium ion levels in the blood, hypercalcemia, along with autonomous production of parathyroid hormone and adenoma in all four parathyroid glands. Upon diagnosis treatment of tertiary hyperparathyroidism usually leads to a surgical intervention.

== Presentation ==
Symptoms in tertiary hyperparathyroidism are generally those seen in relation to elevated blood calcium levels. Tertiary hyperparathyroidism shares many symptomatic features with that of primary hyperparathyroidism, as the two are defined by hypercalcemia. These symptoms can vary greatly from asymptomatic to conditions leading to decreased quality of life.

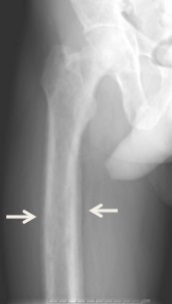
Thinning of long bones due to tertiary hyperparathyroidism

Non-specific symptoms include feeling tired and thirsty; mood changes, including feeling low or depressed, weak and irritable; itching; headache; joint pain; forgetfulness; and abdominal pain. More specific symptoms related to elevated blood calcium and phosphate levels include bone pain or osteodynia and tenderness which are common and related to proximal muscle tenderness. Other signs can include pancreatitis, kidney stones, corneal calcifications, thinning of long bones, and hypodermic calcifications which may be palpable in some patients.

Calciphylaxis, though uncommon, can develop in patients with tertiary hyperparathyroidism. The product of elevated calcium and phosphate, forming crystal structures, that are then deposited in blood vessels. These crystals cause an inflammatory response and can lead to the occlusion of smaller vessels. Further complications like secondary infections and necrosis can develop from this and can be fatal for some, making the monitoring of blood calcium and phosphate levels necessary.

Conditions due to bone loss such as osteopenia and osteoporosis are common in tertiary hyperparathyroidism along with pathologic fractures. Pseudoclubbing of the digits can also be indicative of a severe tertiary hyperparathyroidism due to excess resorption at the distal phalanges.

Diagnosis includes both clinical and laboratory investigations. Radiological investigations include looking for signs of bone loss in both the hands and pelvis which is characteristic of tertiary hyperparathyroidism. Other clinical examination can include grading of muscle weakness, which is done by asking the patient to stand from a seated position with their hands folded across their chest. Laboratory investigations include evaluating blood calcium and alkaline phosphatase, which are always increased in tertiary hyperparathyroidism. Other common results from laboratory investigations would include decreased vitamin D levels, elevated blood parathyroid hormone and hyperphosphatemia.

== Etiology ==
Hyperparathyroidism, in general, is caused by either tumorous growth in one or more parathyroid glands or a prolonged decrease in blood calcium levels or hypocalcaemia which in turn stimulates the production of parathyroid hormone release from the parathyroid gland. The parathyroid gland is located beside the thyroid gland in the neck, below and in front of the larynx and above the trachea. It is composed of four glands in total that monitor blood calcium levels via the calcium sensing receptors, a g-coupled protein receptor. The parathyroid glands main role is calcium homeostasis. Histologically, these glands are composed of chief cells and oxyphil cells with the chief cell primarily responsible for the storing and release of parathyroid hormone. These cells are arranged in a pseudo-follicular pattern similar to the thyroid follicles. Keratin staining is used to image the parathyroid hormone granules.

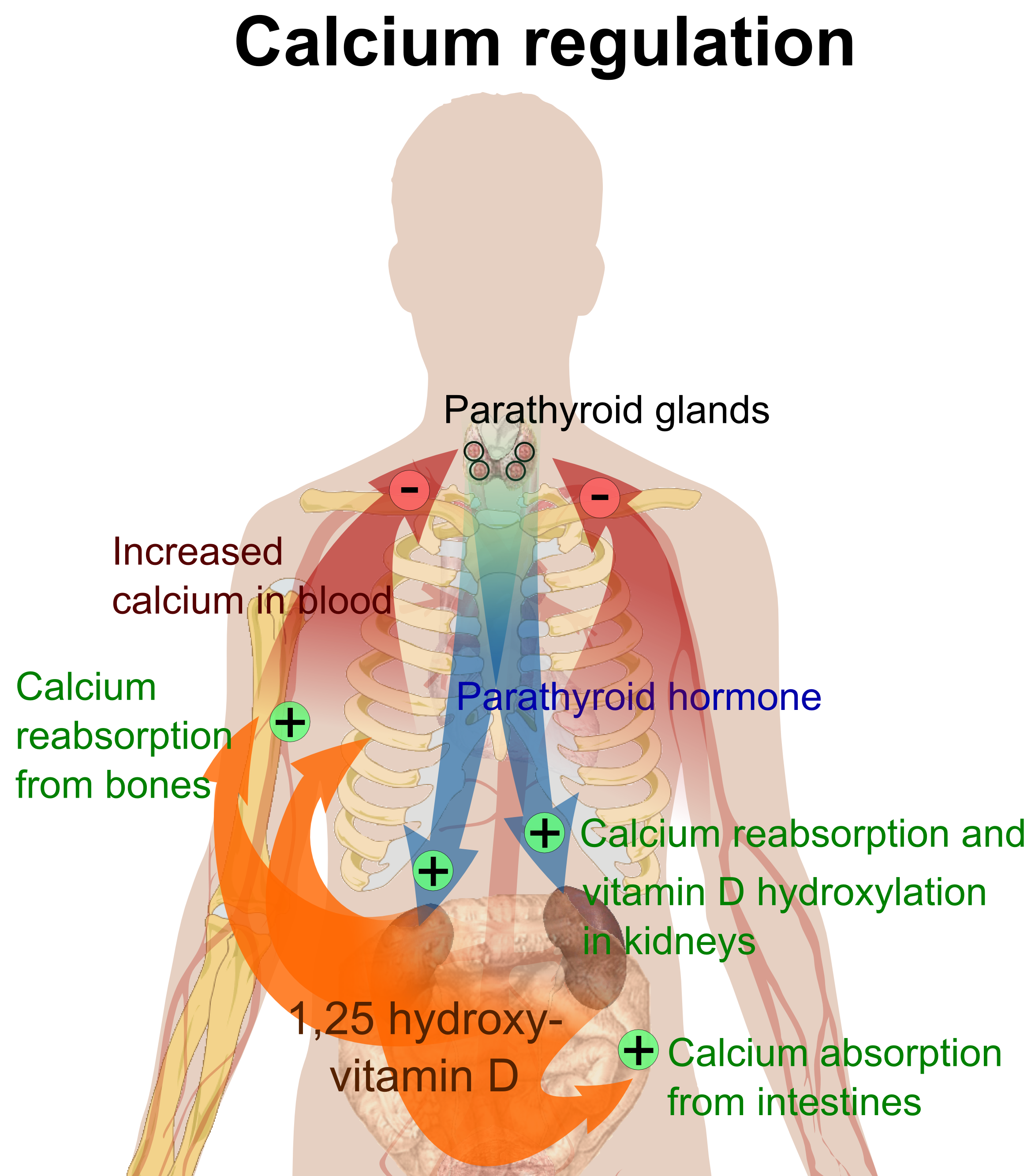
Calcium regulation feedback loop

Parathyroid hormone is responsible for the induction of increased calcium absorption in the gastrointestinal tract or gut and in the kidney. It also induces calcium and phosphate resorption from the bone by osteoclasts. Parathyroid hormone also plays a role in activating vitamin D from its pro form to its active form. Vitamin D is also responsible for increased blood calcium levels and works in conjunction with parathyroid hormone. Vitamin D is also partly responsible for the inhibition of parathyroid hormone release by binding Vitamin D receptors at the parathyroid gland.

PTH feedback loop for calcium

Tertiary hyperparathyroidism is defined by autonomous release of parathyroid hormone while in a hypercalcaemic state. Unlike primary hyperparathyroidism, hypercalcemia in the tertiary form is thought to be the result of resolution of secondary hyperparathyroidism rather than adenoma formation alone.

Many of the mechanisms that drive the formation of tertiary hyperparathyroidism are due to outcomes of secondary hyperparathyroidism and so the tertiary from is said to be a continued progressive hyperparathyroidism. Secondary hyperparathyroidism occurs mainly in those who have chronic kidney disease or vitamin D deficiencies both of which lead to malabsorption of calcium and phosphate leading to decreased blood calcium levels inducing a hyperparathyroidism. In cases of patients with tertiary hyperparathyroidism with kidney disease (causing post-surgical PTH levels to be higher) undergoing surgery, the post-surgical drop in PTH levels can cause severe hypocalcemia. This is due to calcium uptake into bones increasing due to unopposed osteoblast activity; this is sometimes termed hungry bone syndrome (HBS). Common causes for HBS are thyroidectomy and parathyroidectomy as well as other types of neck surgery. Hyperphosphatemia in secondary hyperparathyroidism, due to increased parathyroid hormone, is thought to act directly on parathyroid glands and induce a hyperplasia or increased growth of the chief cells in particular. At the same time the hyperplasic parathyroid glands have reduced fibroblast-growth-factor-23 (FGF-23) and vitamin D receptor expression. FGF-23 is partly responsible for phosphate homeostasis and provides negative feedback to the parathyroid gland as does vitamin D.

During prolonged secondary hyperparathyroidism increased blood phosphate levels drive hyperplasia of the parathyroid gland and this acts to reset calcium sensitivity at the calcium sensing receptors leading to tertiary hyperparathyroidism after resolution of the secondary form with the continued release of parathyroid hormone in the presence of hypercalcemia.

=== Risk factors and genetics ===
An elevated risk of developing tertiary hyperparathyroidism exists when late stage kidney disease is not corrected timely. This is due to a hyperphosphatemia acting directly on the parathyroid glands. Genetically, those who have an X-linked dominant disorder that disrupts phosphate transport at the renal tubules (X-Linked hypophosphatemic rickets) and are receiving oral phosphate treatment have shown to be at high risk of developing tertiary hyperparathyroidism in the absence of secondary hyperparathyroidism. Recurring tertiary hyperparathyroidism is generally seen to be caused by incomplete parathyroidectomy without renal transplant and the risk is increased when the parathyroid tissue left after surgery is that of a nodular type.

Other risk factors of tertiary hyperparathyroidism include an elevated risk of developing acute pancreatitis, mainly due to the hypercalcemia associated with the hyperparathyroidism. Other studies have shown a significant increase in the risk of developing malignancies of the urinary tract and renal system with women being more at risk. Though there is some conjecture as to the correlation between hyperparathyroidism and thyroid carcinoma development, there is however a correlation between the two, which is thought to be due to prolonged irradiation of the neck and head for parathyroid adenomas and increased parathyroid hormone.

Other studies have found some correlation in the development of renal disease following parathyroidectomy. However, the mechanism for this effect remains unknown.

== Pathophysiology ==
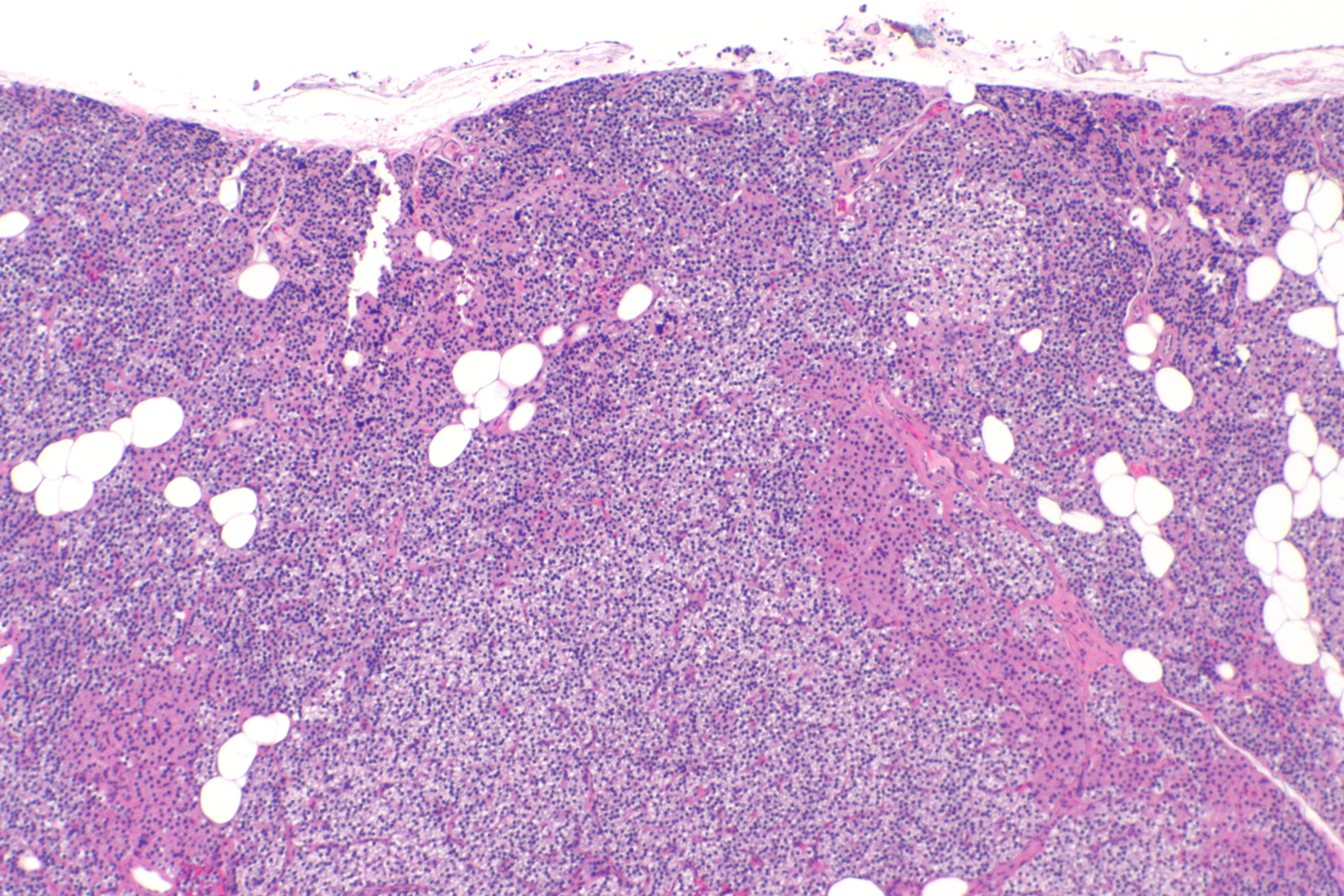
Parathyroid hyperplasia low mag.

Tertiary hyperparathyroidism is almost always related to end stage kidney disease and a secondary hyperparathyroidism. Physiological changes due to the kidney damage adversely affect feedback loops that control secretion of parathyroid hormone. Renal management of phosphate is impaired in secondary hyperparathyroidism which results in hyperphosphatemia.

Primary hyperplasia of the parathyroid gland, results from both hypocalcaemia and increased phosphate levels by decreasing expression of calcium sensing receptors and vitamin D receptors at the parathyroid gland. These decreases in receptor expression lead to hyperfunctioning of the parathyroid. Hyperfunction of the parathyroid gland is thought to exacerbate primary hyperplasia which evolves further to a secondary more aggressive hyperplasia. Histologically, these hyperplasic glands can be either diffuse or nodular. Primary hyperplasia, usually resulting in diffuse polyclonal growth is manly related to reversible secondary hyperparathyroidism. Secondary hyperplasia of the parathyroid gland is more often a nodular, monoclonal growth that sustains secondary hyperparathyroidism and is the catalyst in the progression to tertiary hyperparathyroidism. Nodular hyperplastic glands in tertiary hyperparathyroidism are distinctly larger in both absolute size and weight up to 20-40-fold increases have been reported.

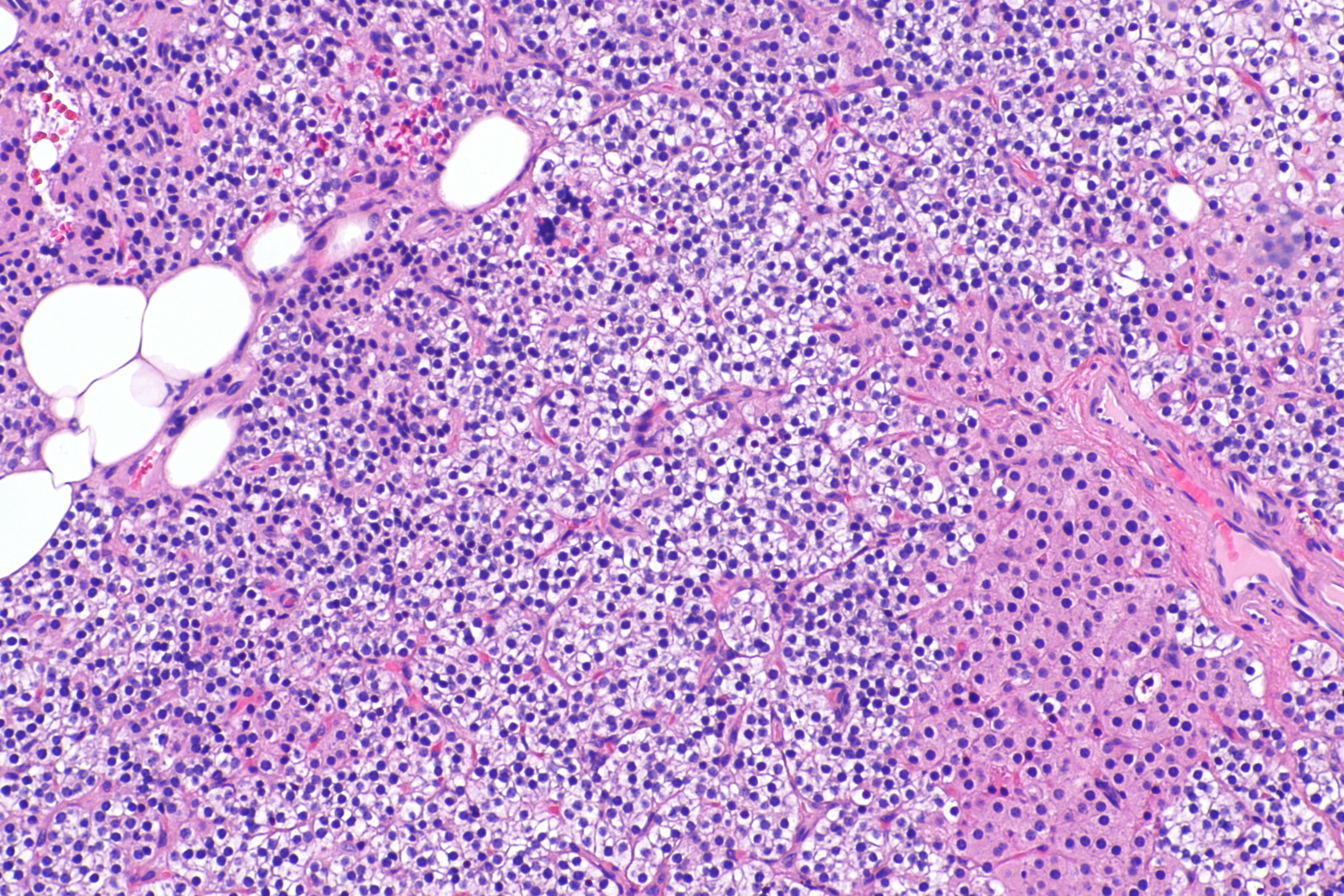
Parathyroid hyperplasia medium mag.

Parathyroid glands are normally composed of chief cells, adipocytes and scattered oxyphil cells. Chief cells are thought to be responsible for the production, storage and secretion of parathyroid hormone. These cells appear light and dark with a prominent Golgi body and endoplasmic reticulum. In electron micrographs, secretory vesicles can be seen in and around the Golgi and at the cell membrane. These cells also contain prominent cytoplasmic adipose. Upon onset of hyperplasia these cells are described as having a nodular pattern with enlargement of protein synthesis machinery such as the endoplasmic reticulum and Golgi. Increased secretory vesicles are seen and decreased intercellular fat is characteristic. Oxyphil cells also appear hyperplasic however, these cells are much less prominent.

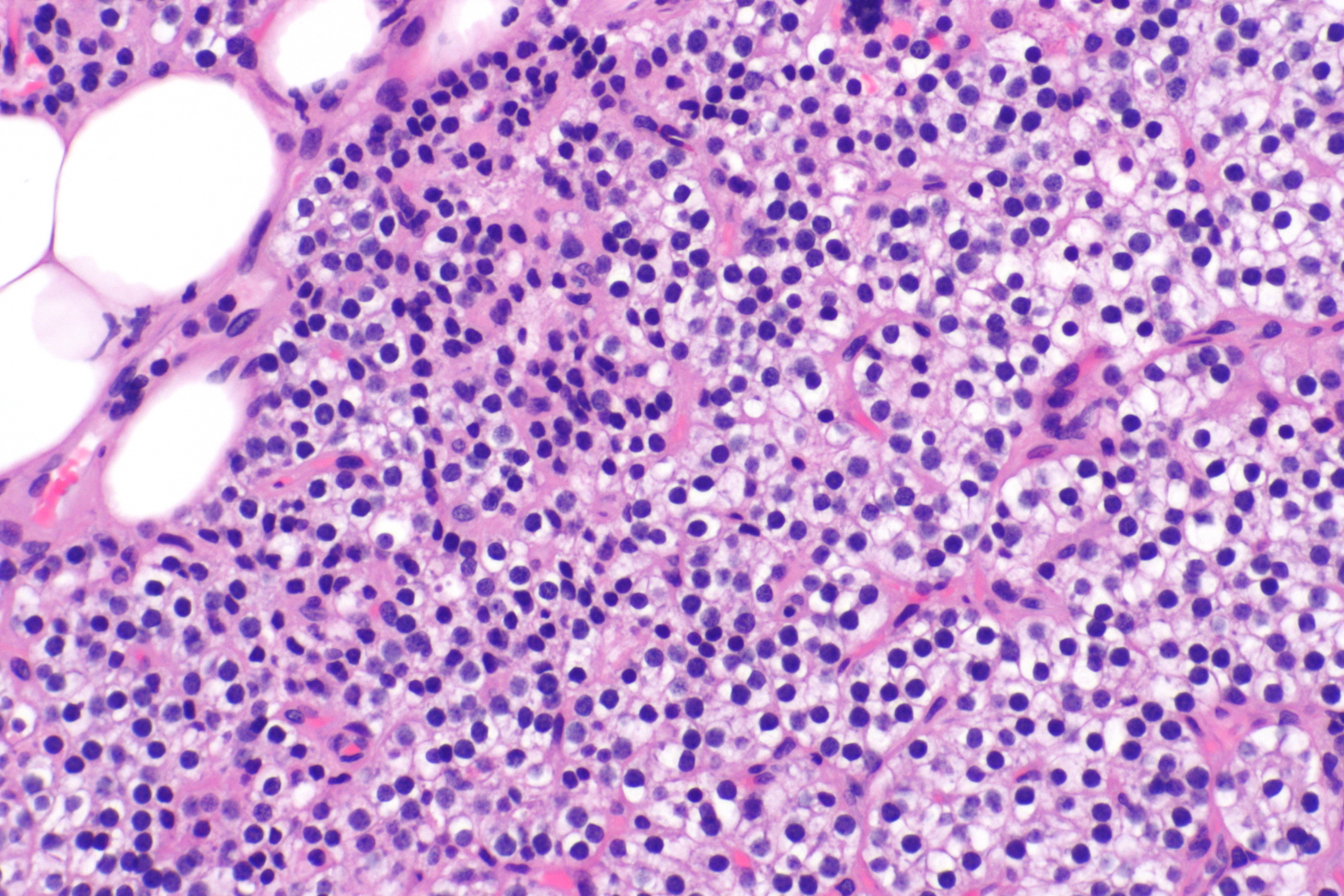
Parathyroid hyperplasia high mag.

Biochemically, there are changes in function between normal and nodular hyperplastic parathyroid glands. These changes involve proto-oncogene expression and activation of proliferative pathways while inactivating apoptotic pathways. In nodular parathyroid tissue increased expression of TGF-a, a growth factor, and EGFR, its receptor, results in aggressive proliferation and further downregulation of vitamin D receptors, which act to suppress hormone secretions. Furthermore, the proliferative marker, Ki67 is seen to be highly expressed in the secondary nodular hyperplastic state. Tumour suppressor genes have also been highlighted as being silenced or degraded in nodular hyperplastic parathyroid tissue. One such gene, p53, has been shown to regulate multiple tumour suppressor pathways and in tumorigenesis can be degraded by b-catenin. This pathway, in some aspect, is mediated by CACYBP, which is highly expressed in nodular parathyroid hyperplasia.

== Treatment ==
Early pharmaceutical treatment for tertiary hyperparathyroidism may include supplementing vitamin D and the use of cinacalcet. Cinacalcet acts to increase the sensitivity of the calcium sensing receptors to calcium leading to a reduction in parathyroid hormone release, however, its use has limited impact in those with tertiary hyperparathyroidism. These treatments are more likely only transient therapies before parathyroidectomy is performed. Indications for surgery in tertiary hyperparathyroidism commonly involve the development of chronic, severe conditions including osteopenia, persistent severe hypercalcemia, bone pain and pathologic fracture. Other indications include development of conditions such calciphylaxis. Surgical options for tertiary hyperparathyroidism include subtotal parathyroidectomy (three and one half of total tissue) and total parathyroidectomy with autotransplantation of resected tissue. Outcomes from surgery are generally favourable and a return to normalised blood calcium levels and parathyroid function is seen.

== History ==
In 1962, Dr C.E Dent reported that autonomous hyperparathyroidism may result from malabsorption syndromes and chronic kidney disease. The term 'tertiary hyperparathyroidism' was first used in 1963 by Dr Walter St. Gaur to describe a case reported on at Massachusetts General hospital. This case involved a patient who had presented with autonomous parathyroid adenoma causing hypercalcemia with a background of parathyroid hyperplasia. Further reports were recorded in 1964, 65 and 67 of suspected tertiary hyperparathyroidism.

In 1968 Davies, Dent and Watson produced a historic case study where they reviewed 200 cases of previously diagnosed primary hyperparathyroidism and found the majority of these cases should be reclassified as tertiary. These were important findings as it allowed an understanding into distinguishing features of primary, secondary and tertiary hyperparathyroidism which then allows appropriate medical treatment.

It is now understood that tertiary hyperparathyroidism is defined as the presence of hypercalcemia, hyperphosphatemia and parathyroid hormone due to terminally biased parathyroid-bone-kidney feedback loop. Although there is still conjecture as to whether tertiary hyperparathyroidism is also due to adenomatous growth or hyperplasia it is clear that tertiary hyperparathyroidism presents with some form of tissue enlargement in all four parathyroid glands.

== See also ==
- Hyperparathyroidism
- Primary hyperparathyroidism
- Secondary hyperparathyroidism
