= Paricalcitol =

Chemical compound

Clinical data
- Trade names: Zemplar
- Other names: (1R,3S)-5-[2-[(1R,3aR,7aS)-1-[(2R,5S)-6-hydroxy-5,6-dimethyl-3E-hepten-2-yl]-7a-methyl-2,3,3a,5,6,7-hexahydro-1H-inden-4-ylidene]ethylidene]-cyclohexane-1,3-diol
- AHFS/Drugs.com: Monograph
- MedlinePlus: a682335
- Pregnancy category: AU: C
- Routes of administration: Oral, Intravenous
- ATC code: H05BX02 (WHO)

Legal status
- Legal status: AU: S4 (Prescription only); CA: ℞-only; UK: POM (Prescription only); US: ℞-only

Pharmacokinetic data
- Bioavailability: 72%
- Protein binding: 99.8%
- Metabolism: Hepatic
- Elimination half-life: 14-20 hours
- Excretion: Faeces (74%), urine (16%)

Identifiers
- IUPAC name: (1R,3R,7E,17β)-17-[(1R,2E,4S)-5-hydroxy-1,4,5-trimethylhex-2-en-1-yl]-9,10-secoestra-5,7-diene-1,3-diol
- CAS Number: 131918-61-1
- PubChem CID: 5281104
- IUPHAR/BPS: 2791
- DrugBank: DB00910
- ChemSpider: 4444552
- UNII: 6702D36OG5
- KEGG: D00930
- ChEBI: CHEBI:7931
- ChEMBL: ChEMBL1200622
- CompTox Dashboard (EPA): DTXSID4048640
- ECHA InfoCard: 100.184.862

Chemical and physical data
- Formula: C_{27}H_{44}O_{3}
- Molar mass: 416.646 g·mol^{−1}
- InChI: InChI=1S/C27H44O3/c1-18(8-9-19(2)26(3,4)30)24-12-13-25-21(7-6-14-27(24,25)5)11-10-20-15-22(28)17-23(29)16-20/h8-11,18-19,22-25,28-30H,6-7,12-17H2,1-5H3/b9-8+,21-11+/t18-,19+,22-,23-,24-,25+,27-/m1/s1; Key:BPKAHTKRCLCHEA-UBFJEZKGSA-N

Paricalcitol (chemically it is 19-nor-1,25-(OH)_{2}-vitamin D_{2}. Marketed by Abbott Laboratories under the trade name Zemplar) is a drug used for the prevention and treatment of secondary hyperparathyroidism (excessive secretion of parathyroid hormone) associated with chronic kidney failure. It is an analog of 1,25-dihydroxyergocalciferol, the active form of vitamin D_{2} (ergocalciferol).

It was patented in 1989 and approved for medical use in 1998.

== Medical uses ==
Its primary use in medicine is in the treatment of secondary hyperparathyroidism associated with chronic kidney disease. However a 2016 systematic review did not find evidence sufficient to demonstrate an advantage of paricalcitol over non-selective vitamin D derivatives for this indication.

== Adverse effects ==
Adverse effects by frequency:

Very common (>10% frequency):

- Nausea

Common (1-10% frequency):

- Diarrhoea^{†}
- Oedema
- Allergic reaction
- Arthritis
- Dizziness^{†}
- Stomach discomfort^{‡}
- Gastroesophageal reflux disease^{†}
- Acne^{†}
- Hypercalcaemia^{†}
- Hypocalcaemia^{†}
- Hyperphosphataemia
- Decreased appetite^{†}
- Headache
- Breast tenderness^{†}
- Taste changes
- Hypoparathyroidism
- Vertigo
- Rash^{‡}

Uncommon (0.1-1% frequency):

- Abnormal hepatic enzymes^{‡}
- Constipation^{‡}
- Dry mouth^{‡}
- Itchiness^{‡}
- Hives
- Hypersensitivity^{‡}
- Muscle spasms^{‡}
- Bleeding time prolonged
- Aspartate aminotransferase increased
- Laboratory test abnormal
- Weight loss
- Elevated blood creatinine
- Cardiac arrest
- Arrhythmia
- Atrial flutter
- Anaemia
- Leucopenia
- Lymphadenopathy
- Coma
- Stroke
- Transient ischemic attack
- Fainting
- Myoclonus
- Hypoaesthesia
- Paraesthesia
- Glaucoma
- Conjunctivitis
- Ear disorder
- Pulmonary oedema
- Asthma
- Shortness of breath
- Nose bleed
- Cough
- Rectal haemhorrhage
- Colitis
- Gastritis
- Indigestion
- Difficulty swallowing
- Gastrointestinal disorder
- Gastrointestinal haemorrhage
- Bullous dermatitis
- Hair loss
- Hirsutism
- Hyperhidrosis
- Joint pain
- Joint stiffness
- Back pain
- Muscle twitching
- Muscle aches
- Hyperparathyroidism
- Hyperkalaemia
- Hypocalcemia
- Breast cancer
- Sepsis
- Pneumonia
- Infection
- Pharyngitis
- Vaginal infection
- Influenza
- High blood pressure
- Hypotension
- Gait disturbance
- Injection site pain
- Fever
- Chest pain
- Condition aggravated
- Muscle weakness
- Malaise
- Thirst
- Breast pain
- Impotence
- Confusional state
- Delirium
- Depersonalization
- Agitation
- Insomnia
- Nervousness

^{‡} These are adverse effects only seen in patients with grade 3 or 4 chronic kidney disease. ^{†} These are adverse effects only seen in patients with grade 5 chronic kidney disease.

== Contraindications ==
Contraindications include:

- Vitamin D intoxication
- Hypercalcaemia
- Hypersensitivity to paricalcitol or any of its excipients

whereas cautions include:

- Impaired liver function
- It is also advised that physicians regularly monitor their patients' calcium and phosphorus levels.

== Interactions ==
Drugs that may interact with paricalcitol include:

- Ketoconazole, as it may interfere with paricalcitol's metabolism in the liver.
- Digitoxin, hypercalcaemia due to any cause can exacerbate the toxicity of digitoxin.
- Thiazide diuretics or calcium supplements as hypercalcaemia may be induced by this combination
- Magnesium-containing products such as antacids may increase the risk of hypermagnesemia.
- Aluminium-containing products such as antacids may increase the risk of aluminium toxicity.
- Drugs that interfere with the absorption of fat-soluble vitamins, such as cholestyramine may interfere with the absorption of paricalcitol.

== Overdose ==
Electrolyte abnormalities (e.g. hypercalcaemia and hyperphosphataemia) are common overdose symptoms. Treatment is mostly supportive, with particular attention being paid to correcting electrolyte anomalies and reducing intake of calcium in both the form of supplementation and diet. As it is so heavily bound to plasma proteins haemodialysis is unlikely to be helpful in cases of overdose.

Early symptoms of overdose can include:

- Weakness
- Headache
- Somnolence
- Nausea
- Vomiting
- Dry mouth
- Constipation
- Muscle pain
- Bone pain
- Metallic taste in the mouth.

However, many of these symptoms are also indicative of kidney failure and hence may be masked by the patient's condition.

Late symptoms of overdose include:

- Loss of appetite
- Weight loss
- Conjunctivitis (calcific)
- Pancreatitis
- Photophobia
- Rhinorrhoea
- Pruritus
- Hyperthermia
- Decreased libido
- Elevated BUN
- Hypercholesterolaemia
- Elevated AST and ALT
- Ectopic calcification
- Hypertension
- Cardiac arrhythmias
- Somnolence
- Death
- Psychosis (rare)

== Mechanism of action ==
3D structure of paricalcitol

Like 1,25-dihydroxyergocalciferol, paricalcitol acts as an agonist at the vitamin D receptor and thereby lowers parathyroid hormone levels in the blood.

== Pharmacokinetics ==
The plasma concentration of paricalcitol decreases rapidly and log-linearly within two hours after initial intravenous administration. Therefore, it is not expected to accumulate with multiple dosing, since paricalcitol is usually given no more frequently than every other day (3 times per week).
