= Calcilytic =

Calcilytics are pharmaceutical drugs that act as antagonists at the calcium-sensing receptor (CaSR). This increases the secretion of parathyroid hormone (PTH), which has a temporary anabolic effect on bone tissue, producing an increase in both bone volume and bone density due to increased bone deposition and resorption. However, long term use of these causes resorption, degrading the bone to raise blood calcium. Consequently, these drugs have been researched for the treatment of osteoporosis, though with only limited success. More recent research has suggested a number of additional applications for these drugs, such as hyperresponsiveness and inflammation in allergic asthma.

== Examples ==
- NPS-2143
- ATF-936
- AXT-914
- Encaleret
- Ronacaleret
