= Rilotumumab =

Monoclonal antibody

Monoclonal antibody
- Type: Whole antibody
- Source: Human
- Target: HGF

Clinical data
- ATC code: none

Identifiers
- CAS Number: 872514-65-3
- ChemSpider: none
- UNII: 51WEW898IJ
- KEGG: D09659

Chemical and physical data
- Formula: C_{6464}H_{9932}N_{1708}O_{2010}S_{46}
- Molar mass: 145207.27 g·mol^{−1}

Rilotumumab (previously AMG102) is a human monoclonal antibody designed for the treatment of solid tumors.

Rilotumumab was in development by Amgen, Inc. until in November 2014, when Amgen announced it had halted all clinical trials of the compound in advanced gastric cancer (including two Phase III studies) after one of the trials found an increase in the number of deaths in those who were taking rilotumumab and chemotherapy when compared to those who were only administered chemotherapy.
