= Gordon Binder =

American businessman

Gordon M. Binder
- Born: 1935 (age 90–91); Missouri
- Education: Purdue University (B.S.E.E); Harvard Business School (M.B.A)
- Occupations: Businessman; investor; scientist

Gordon M. Binder (born 1935) is an American businessman.

== Early life and education ==
Gordon Binder was born in Missouri. He graduated from Purdue University with a Bachelor of Science in Electrical Engineering and received an M.B.A. from the Harvard Business School as a Baker Scholar.

== Career ==
Binder worked in managing position at Litton Industries and the Ford Motor Company. He served as Chief Financial Officer at the System Development Corporation. In 1982, he joined Amgen as CFO. From 1988 to 2000, he served as its CEO.

He is the Founder and Managing Director of Coastview Capital, a private investment firm. He also serves as Chairman of SRU Biosystems. He sits on the Boards of Directors of Acadia Pharmaceuticals, Cellular Genomics, PhRMA and the Biotechnology Industry Organization. along with Henri Termeer.

He is a member of the Board of Trustees of the Massachusetts Institute of Technology, the California Institute of Technology and the American Enterprise Institute. He was elected a Fellow of the American Academy of Arts and Sciences in 2001.

== Bibliography ==
- Science lessons: What the Business of Biotech Taught Me About Management (with Philip Bashe, Harvard Business Review Press, 2008)
