= Elcatonin =

Chemical compound

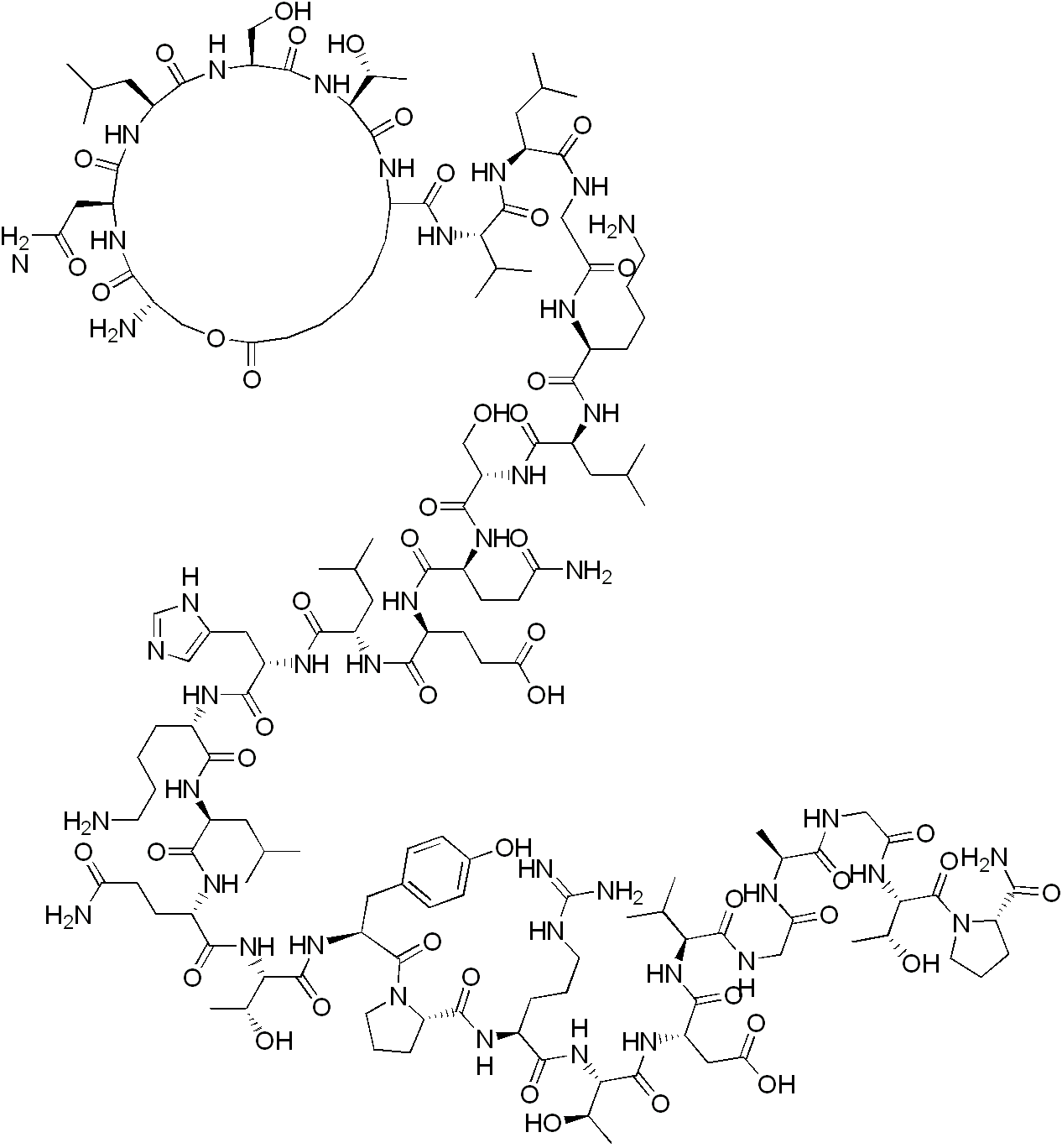

Clinical data
- AHFS/Drugs.com: International Drug Names
- ATC code: H05BA04 (WHO)

Identifiers
- CAS Number: 60731-46-6
- PubChem CID: 16129700
- ChemSpider: 17294280
- UNII: W0CMS474JK
- KEGG: D03287
- ECHA InfoCard: 100.056.703

Chemical and physical data
- Formula: C_{148}H_{244}N_{42}O_{47}
- Molar mass: 3363.827 g·mol^{−1}
- 3D model (JSmol): Interactive image
- SMILES: [H]/N=C(/N)\NCCC[C@@H](C(=O)N[C@@H]([C@@H](C)O)C(=O)N[C@@H](CC(=O)O)C(=O)N[C@@H](C(C)C)C(=O)NCC(=O)N[C@@H](C)C(=O)NCC(=O)N[C@@H]([C@@H](C)O)C(=O)N1CCC[C@H]1C(=O)N)NC(=O)[C@@H]2CCCN2C(=O)[C@H](Cc3ccc(cc3)O)NC(=O)[C@H]([C@@H](C)O)NC(=O)[C@H](CCC(=O)N)NC(=O)[C@H](CC(C)C)NC(=O)[C@H](CCCCN)NC(=O)[C@H](Cc4c[nH]cn4)NC(=O)[C@H](CC(C)C)NC(=O)[C@H](CCC(=O)O)NC(=O)[C@H](CCC(=O)N)NC(=O)[C@H](CO)NC(=O)[C@H](CC(C)C)NC(=O)[C@H](CCCCN)NC(=O)CNC(=O)[C@H](CC(C)C)NC(=O)[C@H](C(C)C)NC(=O)[C@@H]5CCCCCC(=O)N[C@H](C(=O)N[C@H](C(=O)N[C@H](C(=O)N[C@H](C(=O)N[C@H](C(=O)N5)[C@@H](C)O)CO)CC(C)C)CC(=O)N)CO
- InChI: InChI=1S/C148H244N42O47/c1-69(2)52-91(178-142(232)115(75(13)14)185-127(217)86-30-21-20-22-36-108(202)165-100(65-191)137(227)177-97(59-107(153)201)135(225)175-95(56-73(9)10)133(223)182-102(67-193)139(229)188-116(77(16)194)143(233)171-86)122(212)160-63-110(204)164-84(31-23-25-47-149)123(213)172-94(55-72(7)8)132(222)181-101(66-192)138(228)169-88(41-44-105(151)199)125(215)167-90(43-46-112(206)207)126(216)174-93(54-71(5)6)131(221)176-96(58-82-61-157-68-162-82)134(224)166-85(32-24-26-48-150)124(214)173-92(53-70(3)4)130(220)168-89(42-45-106(152)200)129(219)187-118(79(18)196)145(235)180-99(57-81-37-39-83(198)40-38-81)146(236)190-51-29-35-104(190)140(230)170-87(33-27-49-158-148(155)156)128(218)186-117(78(17)195)144(234)179-98(60-113(208)209)136(226)184-114(74(11)12)141(231)161-62-109(203)163-76(15)121(211)159-64-111(205)183-119(80(19)197)147(237)189-50-28-34-103(189)120(154)210/h37-40,61,68-80,84-104,114-119,191-198H,20-36,41-60,62-67,149-150H2,1-19H3,(H2,151,199)(H2,152,200)(H2,153,201)(H2,154,210)(H,157,162)(H,159,211)(H,160,212)(H,161,231)(H,163,203)(H,164,204)(H,165,202)(H,166,224)(H,167,215)(H,168,220)(H,169,228)(H,170,230)(H,171,233)(H,172,213)(H,173,214)(H,174,216)(H,175,225)(H,176,221)(H,177,227)(H,178,232)(H,179,234)(H,180,235)(H,181,222)(H,182,223)(H,183,205)(H,184,226)(H,185,217)(H,186,218)(H,187,219)(H,188,229)(H,206,207)(H,208,209)(H4,155,156,158)/t76-,77+,78+,79+,80+,84-,85-,86-,87-,88-,89-,90-,91-,92-,93-,94-,95-,96-,97-,98-,99-,100-,101-,102-,103-,104-,114-,115-,116-,117-,118-,119-/m0/s1; Key:DDPFHDCZUJFNAT-PZPWKVFESA-N

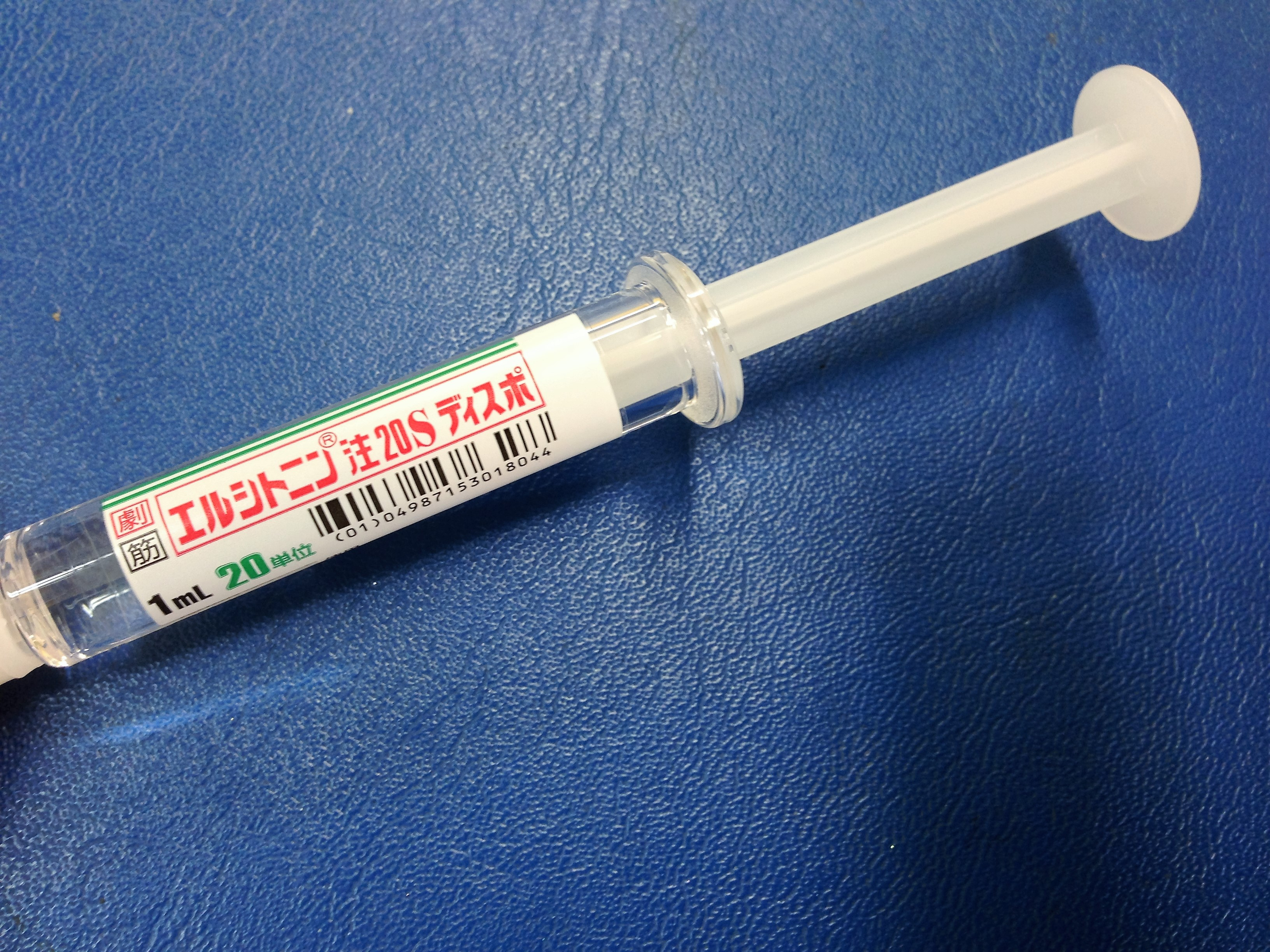
Elcatonin

Elcatonin is a calcitonin derivative used as an anti-parathyroid agent.

It is transformed from eel's calcitonin by changing the S-S bond into a stable C-N bond. It inhibits the absorption and autolysis of bones and thus leads to lowering of blood calcium. It inhibits bone salts from dissolving and transferring and promotes the excretion of calcium and phosphorus in the urine. It inhibits renal tubules from reabsorbing calcium, phosphorus and sodium and keeps blood calcium at a normal level. It is mainly used for remitting or eliminating pain caused by osteoporosis.
