= Robert A. Bradway =

American businessman (born 1962/63)

Robert Bradway
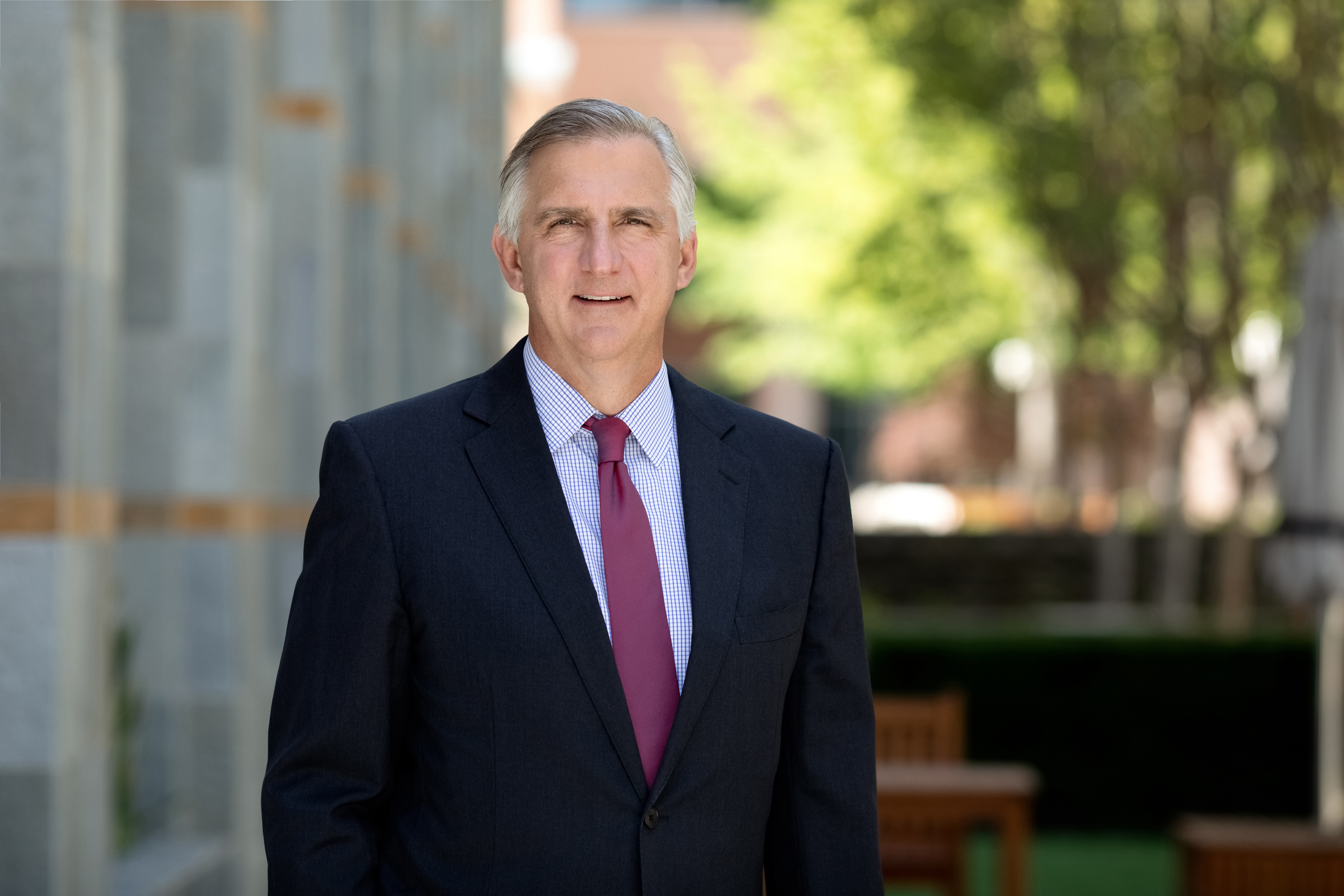
- Born: 1962 or 1963 (age 62–63)
- Education: Amherst College (BA); Harvard University (MBA)
- Occupations: Chairman and Chief Executive Officer of Amgen

Robert A. Bradway (born 1962 or 1963) is an American businessman. He is the chairman and chief executive officer of Amgen.

== Education ==
Bradway holds a B.S. degree in biology from Amherst College and an M.B.A. from Harvard University.

== Career ==
Bradway joined Morgan Stanley in New York in 1985 as a health care industry investment banker. In 1990 he moved to London, where he was a managing director with responsibility for the firm's banking department and corporate finance activities in Europe.

Bradway joined Amgen in 2006 as vice president of operations strategy, and was executive vice president and chief financial officer from April 2007 to May 2010. He was its president and chief operating officer from May 2010 to May 2012. In October 2011, he was appointed to the Amgen board of directors. Bradway was named CEO of Amgen in May 2012, and chairman of the board in January 2013.

During Bradway’s tenure as CEO, Amgen's annual revenue increased from $17.3 billion in 2012 to $26 billion in 2021, and annual R&D investment increased to $4.2 billion in 2020. Bradway oversaw the acquisition of Iceland-based DeCODE Genetics in 2012, Onyx Pharmaceuticals in 2013, and a 20.5% equity stake in Beijing-based BeiGene in 2020.

=== Boards and volunteer activities ===
Bradway is on the board of directors of Boeing. He gave the 2016 commencement speech at the Keck Graduate Institute, which is part of The Claremont Colleges. He gave the 2017 commencement speech at the UCLA Anderson School of Management, where he is on the board of trustees and on the board of the Leonard D. Schaeffer Center for Health Policy and Economics.

He is the chairman of the CEO Roundtable on Cancer and a member of the American Heart Association CEO Roundtable.

=== Public statements ===
Bradway was a keynote speaker at the 2015 World Medical Innovation Forum. In June 2017, he gave the keynote address at the commencement ceremony for graduates of the University of California, Los Angeles Anderson School of Management. Bradway was a speaker at Fortune magazine's Brainstorm Health virtual conference in June 2020.

Following the 2020 murder of George Floyd in May 2020, Bradway issued a statement condemning the murder as "senseless" and pledging to address racial inequality at Amgen, stating, "Let's take inspiration from science and trust that progress, like knowledge, builds upon itself, incrementally improving on what exists today until the cumulative adds up to something profound."

On October 1, 2020, Bradway testified before the House Oversight Committee and was questioned by Rep. Katie Porter (D. Cal) for his considerable compensation. He and four other top Amgen executives earned a combined $124.2 million over a three-year period spanning 2017–2019.
