= Doxercalciferol =

Names
- IUPAC name (1S,3R,5Z,7E,22E)-9,10-Secoergosta-5,7,10,22-tetraene-1,3-diol
- Other names 1-Hydroxyergocalciferol; 1-Hydroxyvitamin D2; 1α-Hydroxyergocalciferol; 1α-Hydroxyvitamin D2; Hectorol; TSA 840

Identifiers
CAS Number	54573-75-0
3D model (JSmol)	Interactive image
ChEBI	CHEBI:4712
ChEMBL	ChEMBL1200810
ChemSpider	4444554
DrugBank	DB06410
ECHA InfoCard	100.170.997
IUPHAR/BPS	2790
PubChem CID	5281107
UNII	3DIZ9LF5Y9
CompTox Dashboard (EPA)	DTXSID1034214
- InChI: InChI=1S/C28H44O2/c1-18(2)19(3)9-10-20(4)25-13-14-26-22(8-7-15-28(25,26)6)11-12-23-16-24(29)17-27(30)21(23)5/h9-12,18-20,24-27,29-30H,5,7-8,13-17H2,1-4,6H3/b10-9+,22-11+,23-12-/t19-,20+,24+,25+,26-,27-,28+/m0/s1 Key: HKXBNHCUPKIYDM-CGMHZMFXSA-N; InChI=1/C28H44O2/c1-18(2)19(3)9-10-20(4)25-13-14-26-22(8-7-15-28(25,26)6)11-12-23-16-24(29)17-27(30)21(23)5/h9-12,18-20,24-27,29-30H,5,7-8,13-17H2,1-4,6H3/b10-9+,22-11+,23-12-/t19-,20+,24+,25+,26-,27-,28+/m0/s1 Key: HKXBNHCUPKIYDM-CGMHZMFXBN
- SMILES: O[C@@H]1CC(\C(=C)[C@@H](O)C1)=C\C=C2/CCC[C@]3([C@H]2CC[C@@H]3[C@@H](/C=C/[C@H](C)C(C)C)C)C

Properties
Chemical formula	C_{28}H_{44}O_{2}
Molar mass	412.658 g·mol^{−1}

Pharmacology
ATC code	H05BX03 (WHO)
- Except where otherwise noted, data are given for materials in their standard state (at 25 °C [77 °F], 100 kPa). verify (what is ?) Infobox references

Doxercalciferol (or 1-hydroxyergocalciferol, trade name Hectorol) is drug for secondary hyperparathyroidism and metabolic bone disease. It is a synthetic analog of ergocalciferol (vitamin D_{2}). It suppresses parathyroid synthesis and secretion.

Doxercalciferol is the vitamin D_{2} analogue of alfacalcidol. It undergoes 25-hydroxylation in the liver to become the active ercalcitriol, without the involvement of kidneys.
