= John Carbon =

American biochemist

John A. Carbon
- Education: University of Illinois (B.S. 1952), Northwestern University (Ph.D., 1955)
- Known for: Carbon-Clarke equation, shotgun clone libraries, artificial chromosomes
- Spouse: Louise B. Clarke
- Scientific career
- Fields: Genetic missense suppression, centromeres
- Institutions: Abbott Laboratories (North Chicago, Illinois), University of California, Santa Barbara

John A. Carbon is a professor emeritus of molecular and cellular biology at the University of California, Santa Barbara.

== Biography ==
He earned his B.S. degree in chemistry in 1952 at the University of Illinois, and his Ph.D. degree in biochemistry in 1955 from Northwestern University. He did basic research developing new anticancer drugs at Abbott Laboratories (North Chicago, IL) for 12 years (1956-1968). He joined the faculty of the University of California, Santa Barbara in 1968, and became professor emeritus in 1999. His research contributions include elucidation of the mechanism of genetic missense suppression in bacteria, the development of techniques to make genomic libraries using recombinant DNA, techniques for using yeast for DNA cloning, characterization of centromere DNA, and construction of the first artificial chromosomes. Many of his later research contributions were carried out in collaboration with his wife, Professor Louise B. Clarke. He was elected to membership in the United States National Academy of Sciences and the American Academy of Arts and Sciences in 1986. Carbon was among the founding scientific advisors of the Amgen Corporation. An endowed chair in Biochemistry and Molecular Biology at UC Santa Barbara was named for Carbon. The chair is currently held by Jamey Marth.

Carbon and Louise Clarke, his wife, published the Carbon-Clarke equation in 1976, used for calculating the number of clones required when constructing a clone library to ensure a given probability (usually > 99% is desired) of containing any sequence, given the size of the genome and the average size of a clone.
