= ATC code H05 =

ATC code H05 Calcium homeostasis is a therapeutic subgroup of the Anatomical Therapeutic Chemical Classification System, a system of alphanumeric codes developed by the World Health Organization (WHO) for the classification of drugs and other medical products. Subgroup H05 is part of the anatomical group H Systemic hormonal preparations, excluding sex hormones and insulins.

Codes for veterinary use (ATCvet codes) can be created by placing the letter Q in front of the human ATC code: for example, QH05.
National versions of the ATC classification may include additional codes not present in this list, which follows the WHO version.

== H05A Parathyroid hormones and analogues ==
=== H05AA Parathyroid hormones and analogues ===
H05AA01 Parathyroid gland extract
H05AA02 Teriparatide
H05AA03 Parathyroid hormone
H05AA04 Abaloparatide
H05AA05 Palopegteriparatide

== H05B Anti-parathyroid agents ==
=== H05BA Calcitonin preparations ===
H05BA01 Calcitonin (salmon synthetic)
H05BA02 Calcitonin (pork natural)
H05BA03 Calcitonin (human synthetic)
H05BA04 Elcatonin

=== H05BX Other anti-parathyroid agents ===
H05BX01 Cinacalcet
H05BX02 Paricalcitol
H05BX03 Doxercalciferol
H05BX04 Etelcalcetide
H05BX05 Calcifediol
H05BX06 Evocalcet
