= Palopegteriparatide =

Medication

Clinical data
- Trade names: Yorvipath
- Other names: ACP-014, TransCon PTH
- AHFS/Drugs.com: Monograph
- MedlinePlus: a624051
- License data: US DailyMed: Palopegteriparatide
- Routes of administration: Subcutaneous
- Drug class: Hormonal agent
- ATC code: H05AA05 (WHO)

Legal status
- Legal status: AU: S4 (Prescription only); CA: ℞-only; US: ℞-only; EU: Rx-only

Identifiers
- CAS Number: 2222514-07-8
- UNII: G2N64C3385
- KEGG: D12395

Palopegteriparatide, sold under the brand name Yorvipath, is a hormone replacement therapy used for the treatment of hypoparathyroidism. It is a transiently pegylated parathyroid hormone. It is a parathyroid hormone analog.

Palopegteriparatide was approved for medical use in the European Union in November 2023, and in the United States in August 2024.

== Medical uses ==
Palopegteriparatide is indicated for the treatment of adults with hypoparathyroidism.

== Adverse effects ==
The US Food and Drug Administration (FDA) prescription label for palopegteriparatide includes warnings for a potential risk of risk of unintended changes in serum calcium levels related to number of daily injections and total delivered dose, serious hypocalcemia and hypercalcemia (blood calcium levels that are too high), osteosarcoma (a rare bone cancer) based on findings in rats, orthostatic hypotension (dizziness when standing), and a risk of a drug interaction with digoxin (a medicine for certain heart conditions).

== History ==
The effectiveness of palopegteriparatide was evaluated in a 26-week, randomized, double-blind, placebo-controlled trial that enrolled 82 adults with hypoparathyroidism. Prior to randomization, all participants underwent an approximate four-week screening period in which calcium and active vitamin D supplements were adjusted to achieve an albumin-corrected serum calcium concentration between 7.8 and 10.6 mg/dL, a magnesium concentration ≥1.3 mg/dL and below the upper limit of the reference range, and a 25(OH) vitamin D concentration between 20 and 80 ng/mL. During the double-blind period, participants were randomized to either palopegteriparatide (N = 61) or placebo (N= 21), at a starting dose of 18 mcg/day, co-administered with conventional therapy (calcium and active vitamin D). Study drug and conventional therapy were subsequently adjusted according to the albumin-corrected serum calcium levels. At the end of the trial, 69% of the participants in the palopegteriparatide group compared to 5% of the participants in the placebo group were able to maintain their calcium level in the normal range, without needing active vitamin D and high doses of calcium (calcium dose ≤ 600 mg/day).

The FDA granted the application for palopegteriparatide orphan drug and priority review designations.

== Society and culture ==
=== Legal status ===
In September 2023, the Committee for Medicinal Products for Human Use (CHMP) of the European Medicines Agency (EMA) adopted a positive opinion, recommending the granting of a marketing authorization for the medicinal product Yorvipath, intended for the treatment of chronic hypoparathyroidism in adults. The applicant for this medicinal product is Ascendis Pharma Bone Diseases A/S. Palopegteriparatide was approved for medical use in the European Union in November 2023.

Palopegteriparatide was granted an orphan drug designation by the US Food and Drug Administration (FDA) in 2018, and by the EMA in 2020.

=== Brand names ===
Palopegteriparatide is the international nonproprietary name.

Palopegteriparatide is sold under the brand name Yorvipath.
