= Evocalcet =

Chemical compound

Clinical data
- Trade names: Orkedia
- ATC code: H05BX06 (WHO)

Identifiers
- IUPAC name: 2-[4-[(3S)-3-[[(1R)-1-Naphthalen-1-ylethyl]amino]pyrrolidin-1-yl]phenyl]acetic acid
- CAS Number: 870964-67-3
- PubChem CID: 71242808
- DrugBank: DB12388
- ChemSpider: 44208828
- UNII: E58MLH082P
- KEGG: D11063
- ChEMBL: ChEMBL4297621
- CompTox Dashboard (EPA): DTXSID101132784

Chemical and physical data
- Formula: C_{24}H_{26}N_{2}O_{2}
- Molar mass: 374.484 g·mol^{−1}
- 3D model (JSmol): Interactive image
- SMILES: C[C@H](C1=CC=CC2=CC=CC=C21)N[C@H]3CCN(C3)C4=CC=C(C=C4)CC(=O)O
- InChI: InChI=1S/C24H26N2O2/c1-17(22-8-4-6-19-5-2-3-7-23(19)22)25-20-13-14-26(16-20)21-11-9-18(10-12-21)15-24(27)28/h2-12,17,20,25H,13-16H2,1H3,(H,27,28)/t17-,20+/m1/s1; Key:RZNUIYPHQFXBAN-XLIONFOSSA-N

Evocalcet (trade name Orkedia) is a drug for the treatment of hyperparathyroidism. It acts as a calcium-sensing receptor agonist.

In 2018, it was approved in Japan for treatment of secondary hyperparathyroidism in patients on dialysis.
