= Calcimimetic =

Pharmaceutical drug

A calcimimetic is a pharmaceutical drug that mimics the action of calcium on tissues, by allosteric activation of the calcium-sensing receptor that is expressed in various human organ tissues. Calcimimetics are used to treat secondary hyperparathyroidism (SHPT).

In the treatment of SHPT patients on dialysis calcimimetics does not appear to affect the risk of early death. It does decrease the need for a parathyroidectomy but caused more issues with low blood calcium levels and vomiting.

Cinacalcet was the first calcimimetic to be approved. Cinacalcet mimics calcium at the parathyroid hormone receptor. This binding will increase the sensitivity of calcium-sensing receptors (CaSR) on the parathyroid gland. As a result of the receptor "thinking" there is sufficient calcium, parathyroid hormone (PTH) secretion will be reduced. Lower calcium levels will be seen as well.

On August 25, 2015 Amgen Inc. announced that it had submitted a new drug application with the United States Food and Drug Administration for a new calcimimetic, etelcalcetide (formerly velcalcetide), for the treatment of SHPT in chronic kidney disease (CKD) patients on hemodialysis. Etelcalcetide is administered intravenously thrice weekly at the end of each dialysis session. Etelcalcetide binds to the CaSR on the parathyroid gland, which results in receptor activation and ultimately reduction in PTH.

Calcimimetics can be used concomitantly with vitamin D therapy.

Calcimimetic use can have side effects. Common side effects include: nausea and vomiting, hypocalcemia, and adynamic bone disease if intact parathyroid hormone (iPTH) levels drop below 100pg/mL.
