= Calcium-sensing receptor =

Mammalian protein found in humans

CASR

Identifiers
- Aliases: CASR, CAR, EIG8, FHH, FIH, GPRC2A, HHC, HHC1, HYPOC1, NSHPT, PCAR1, calcium sensing receptor, hCasR, Calcium-sensing receptor+CaSR
- External IDs: OMIM: 601199; MGI: 1351351; GeneCards: CASR
Available structures
PDB	Ortholog search: PDBe RCSB
PDB	List of PDB id codes 5FBH, 5FBK, 7DTT, 7SIN, 7DD6, 7DTW

Gene location (Human)
Chr.	Chromosome 3 (human)
Band	3q13.33-q21.1	Start	122,183,668 bp
Band	3q13.33-q21.1	End	122,291,629 bp

Gene location (Mouse)
Chr.	Chromosome 16 (mouse)
Band	16 B3|16 25.57 cM	Start	36,314,058 bp
Band	16 B3|16 25.57 cM	End	36,382,503 bp
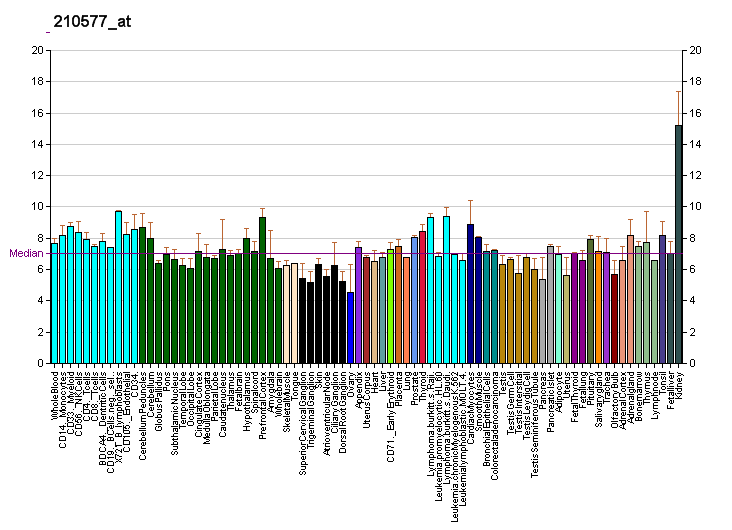

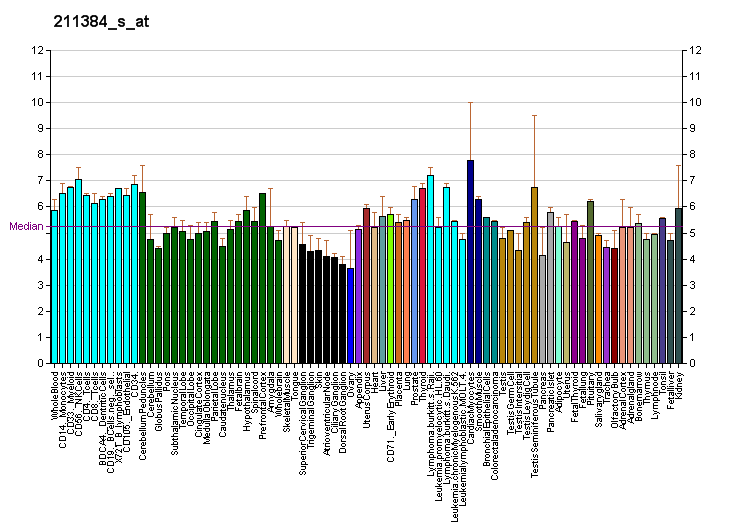
RNA expression pattern
Bgee	Human / Mouse (ortholog); Top expressed in: islet of Langerhans; body of pancreas; human kidney; buccal mucosa cell; pancreatic ductal cell; gallbladder; renal medulla; kidney tubule; duodenum; liver / Top expressed in: muscle of thigh; sternocleidomastoid muscle; right kidney; outer renal medulla; human kidney; distal tubule; triceps brachii muscle; islet of Langerhans; quadriceps femoris muscle; vastus lateralis muscle; More reference expression data
BioGPS	More reference expression data
Gene ontology
Molecular function	protein binding; signal transducer activity; phosphatidylinositol phospholipase C activity; G protein-coupled receptor activity; amino acid binding; protein homodimerization activity; metal ion binding; magnesium ion binding; calcium ion binding; polyamine binding; integrin binding; protein kinase binding; transmembrane transporter binding; signaling receptor activity
Cellular component	integral component of membrane; plasma membrane; membrane; integral component of plasma membrane; nucleus; cytoplasm; cell surface; basolateral plasma membrane; apical plasma membrane; axon; neuron projection; soma; axon terminus
Biological process	chemosensory behavior; calcium ion import; anatomical structure morphogenesis; signal transduction; detection of calcium ion; G protein-coupled receptor signaling pathway; ossification; response to ischemia; calcium ion transport; cellular calcium ion homeostasis; apoptotic process; adenylate cyclase-inhibiting G protein-coupled receptor signaling pathway; phospholipase C-activating G protein-coupled receptor signaling pathway; JNK cascade; positive regulation of cell population proliferation; response to metal ion; positive regulation of gene expression; response to organic cyclic compound; positive regulation of insulin secretion; positive regulation of ATP-dependent activity; cellular response to hepatocyte growth factor stimulus; vasodilation; positive regulation of vasoconstriction; branching morphogenesis of an epithelial tube; positive regulation of positive chemotaxis; response to calcium ion; regulation of calcium ion transport; fat pad development; cellular response to vitamin D; cellular response to glucose stimulus; cellular response to low-density lipoprotein particle stimulus; cellular response to hypoxia; response to fibroblast growth factor; positive regulation of calcium ion import; cellular response to peptide; bile acid secretion; chloride transmembrane transport; positive regulation of ERK1 and ERK2 cascade
Sources:Amigo / QuickGO
Orthologs
Databases	NCBI: entry; OMA: entry
Species	Human	Mouse
Entrez	846	12374
Ensembl	ENSG00000036828	ENSMUSG00000051980
UniProt	P41180	Q9QY96
RefSeq (mRNA)	NM_000388; NM_001178065	NM_013803
RefSeq (protein)	NP_000379; NP_001171536	NP_038831
Location (UCSC)	Chr 3: 122.18 – 122.29 Mb	Chr 16: 36.31 – 36.38 Mb
PubMed search
- Wikidata
View/Edit Human	View/Edit Mouse

The calcium-sensing receptor (CaSR) is a Class C G-protein coupled receptor which senses extracellular levels of calcium ions. It is primarily expressed in the parathyroid gland, the renal tubules of the kidney, pancreatic islets and the brain. In the parathyroid gland, it controls calcium homeostasis by regulating the release of parathyroid hormone (PTH). In the kidney, it has an inhibitory effect on the re-absorption of calcium, potassium, sodium, and water depending on which segment of the tubule is being activated. CaSR has regulatory role in insulin secretion, adhesion and beta-cell proliferation in pancreatic islets.

Since the initial review of CaSR, there has been in-depth analysis of its role related to parathyroid disease and other roles related to tissues and organs in the body. 1993, Brown et al. isolated a clone named BoPCaR (bovine parathyroid calcium receptor) which replicated the effect when introduced to polyvalent cations. Because of this, the ability to clone full-length CaSRs from mammals were performed.

== Structure ==
Each protomer of the receptor has a large, N-terminal extracellular domain that linked to create VFT (Venus flytrap) domain. The receptor has a CR (cysteine-rich) domain that links the VFT to the 7 transmembrane domains of the receptor. The 7 transmembrane domain is followed by a long cytoplasmatic tail. The tail has no structure, but still, it has an important role in trafficking and phosphorylation.

The CaSR is a homodimer receptor. The signal transmission occurs only when the agonist binds to the homodimer of the CaSR. Binding of a single protomer will not lead to signal transmission. In vitro experiments showed that the receptor can form a heterodimer with mGlu1/5 or with GABAB receptor. The heterodimerization may facilitate the varied functional roles of the CaSR in different tissues, particularly in the brain.

The CryoEM structures of CasR homodimer was recently solved

=== Extracellular domain ===
The VFT extends outside the cell and is composed of two lobe subdomains. Each lobe forms part of the ligand binding cleft.

In contrast to the conservative structure of other class C GPCR receptors, the CaSR cleft is an allosteric or co-agonist binding site, with the cations (Ca^{2+}) binding elsewhere.

The inactive state of the receptor has two extracellular domains, oriented in an open conformation with an empty intradomain part. When the receptor is activated, the two lobes interact with each other and creates a rotation of the interdomain cleft.

==== Cation binding sites ====
The cation binding sites varied in their location and in the number of repetitive appearances.

The receptor has four Calcium binding sites that have a role in the stabilization of the extracellular domain (ECD) and in the activation of the receptor. The stabilization maintains the receptor in its active conformation.

Calcium cations bind to the first Calcium binding site in the inactive conformation. In the second binding site, Calcium cations are bound to both the active and inactive structures. In the third binding Site, the binding of the calcium facilitates the closure of lobe 1 and 2. This closure permits the interaction between the two lobes. The fourth binding site is located on lobe 2 in a place close to the CR domain. The agonist binding to the fourth binding site leads formation of homodimer interface bridge. This bridge between lobe 2 domain of subunit 1 and the CR domain of subunit 2, stabilize the open conformation.

The order of Calcium binding affinity to four of the bindings sites is as follows: 1 = 2 > 3 > 4. The lower affinity of Calcium to site 4 indicates that the receptor is activated only when the calcium concentration is elevated above the required concentration. That behavior makes the binding of calcium at site 4 to hold a major role in stabilization.

The CaSR also has binding sites for Magnesium and Gadolinium.

==== Anion binding sites ====
There are four anion binding sites in the ECD. Sites 1-3 are occupied in the inactive structure, whereas in the active structure only sites 2 and 4 are occupied.

=== 7-Transmembrane domain ===
Based on a similarity of CaSR to mGlu5, it is believed that in the inactivated form of the receptor, the VFT domain disrupts the interface between the 7TM domains, and the activation of the receptor force a reorientation of the 7TM domains.

== Signal transduction ==
The inactivated form of the receptor has an open conformation. upon binding of the fourth binding site, the structure of the receptor changes to a close conformation. The change in the structure conformation leads to inhibition of PTH release.

On the intracellular side, initiates the phospholipase C pathway, presumably through a G_{qα} type of G protein, which ultimately increases intracellular concentration of calcium, which inhibits vesicle fusion and exocytosis of parathyroid hormone. It also inhibits (not stimulates, as some sources state) the cAMP dependent pathway.

=== Ligands ===
==== Agonists ====
- Calcium
- Spermine
- Neomycin
- Vitamin D

==== Positive allosteric modulators ====
- Gamma-Glutamyl peptides
- Glucose
- L- amino acids
- Cinacalcet
- Evocalcet
- NPS R-568
- NPS R-467
- Etelcalcetide
- Calhex 231

==== Antagonists ====
- Calcilytics
- Phosphate

==== Negative allosteric modulators ====
- NPS 2143
- Ronacaleret
- Calhex 231

It is unknown whether Ca^{2+} alone can activate the receptor, but L-amino acids and g-Glutamyl peptides are shown to act as co-activator of the receptor. Those molecules intensify the intracellular responses evoked by the Calcium cation.

== Pathology ==
Mutations that inactivate a CaSR gene cause familial hypocalciuric hypercalcemia (FHH) (also known as familial benign hypercalcemia because it is generally asymptomatic and does not require treatment), when present in heterozygotes. Patients who are homozygous for CaSR inactivating mutations have more severe hypercalcemia. Other mutations that activate CaSR are the cause of autosomal dominant hypocalcemia or Type 5 Bartter syndrome. An alternatively spliced transcript variant encoding 1088 aa has been found for this gene, but its full-length nature has not been defined.

=== Role in Chronic kidney disease ===
In CKD, the dysregulation of CaSR leads to a secondary hyperparathyroidism linked with osteoporosis, which considered as one of the main complications.

Patients suffers from secondary hyperparathyroidism require to make changes in their diet in order to balance the disease. The diet recommendation includes restriction of Calcium, phosphate, and protein intake. Those nutrients are abundance in our diet and because of that, avoiding foods that contains those nutrients may limit our dietary options and can lead to other nutrients deficiencies.

== Therapeutic application ==
The drugs cinacalcet and etelcalcetide are allosteric modifiers of the calcium-sensing receptor. They are classified as a calcimimetics, binding to the calcium-sensing receptor and decreasing parathyroid hormone release.

Calcilytic drugs, which block CaSR, produce increased bone density in animal studies and have been researched for the treatment of osteoporosis. Unfortunately clinical trial results in humans have proved disappointing, with sustained changes in bone density not observed despite the drug being well tolerated. More recent research has shown the CaSR receptor to be involved in numerous other conditions including Alzheimer's disease, asthma and some forms of cancer, and calcilytic drugs are being researched as potential treatments for these. Recently it has been shown that biomimetic bone like apatite inhibits formation of bone through endochondral ossification pathway via hyperstimulation of extracellular calcium sensing receptor.

Transactivation across the dimer can result in unique pharmacology for CaSR allosteric modulators. For example, Calhex 231, which shows a positive allosteric activity when bound to the allosteric site in just one protomer. In contrast, it shows a negative allosteric activity when occupying both the allosteric sites of the dimer.

== Interactions ==
Calcium-sensing receptor has been shown to interact with filamin.

== Role in sensory evaluation of food ==
Kokumi was discovered in Japan, 1989. It is defined as a sensation that enhances existing flavors and creates feelings of roundness, complexity, and richness in the mouth. The kokumi is present in different foods such as fish sauce, soybean, garlic, beans, etc. The Kokumi substances are Gamma-glutamyl peptides.

CaSR is known to be expressed in the parathyroid gland and kidneys, but recent experiments showed that the receptor is also expressed in the alimentary canal (known as the digestive tract) and the near the taste buds on the back of the tongue.

Gamma-glutamyl peptides are allosteric modulators of the CaSR, and the binding of those peptides to the CaSR on the tongue is what mediates the Kokumi sensation in the mouth.

In the mouth, unlike in other tissues, the influx of the extracellular Calcium does not affect the receptor activity. Instead, the activation of the CaSR is by the binding of the Gamma glutamine peptides.

Taste signal involves a release of intracellular calcium as respond to the molecule binding to the taste receptor, leads to secretion of neurotransmitter and taste perception. The simultaneous binding of gamma glutamine peptides to the CaSR increases the level of the intracellular calcium, and that intensify the taste perception.
