= Parathyroid disease =

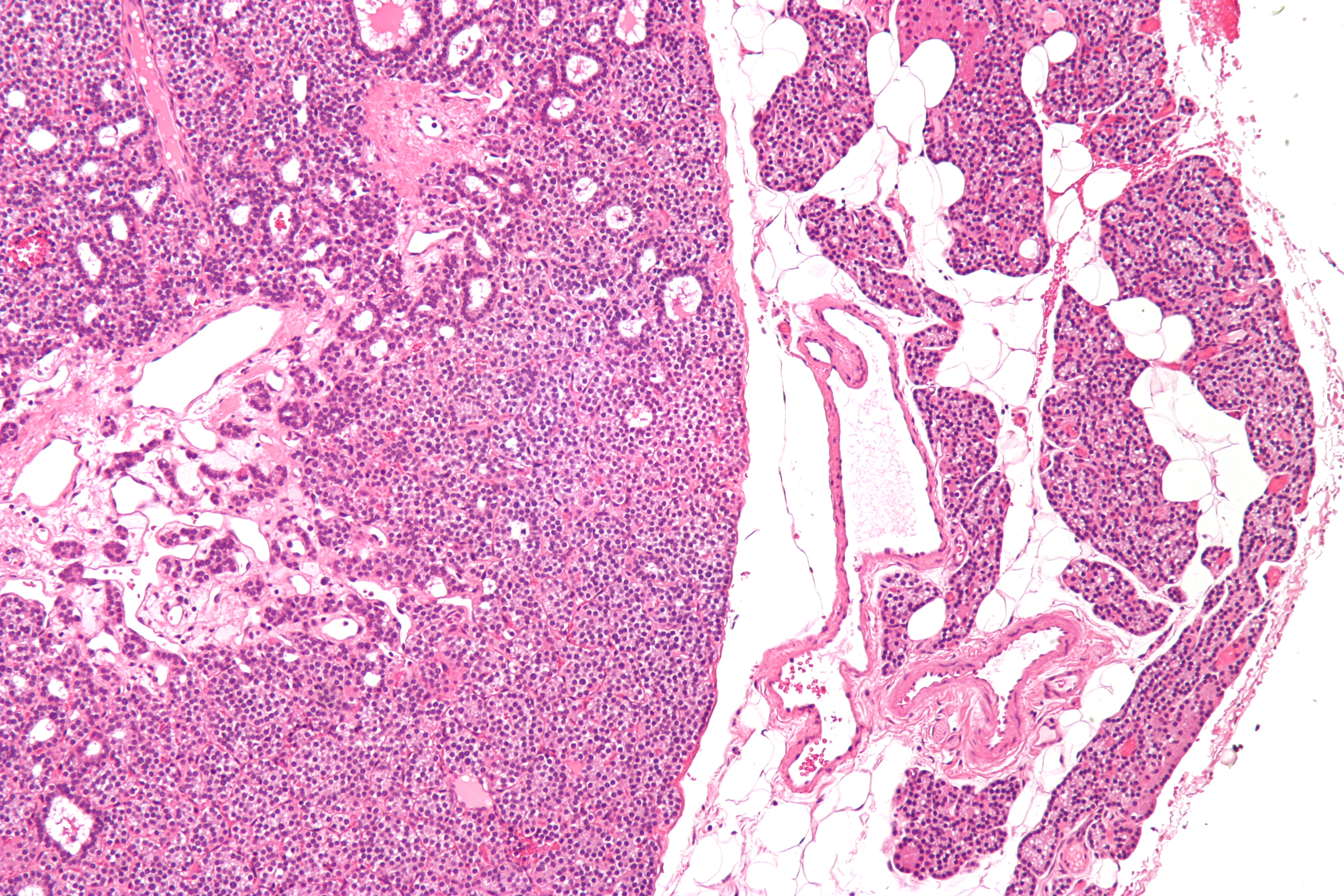
- Micrograph of a parathyroid adenoma (left) and normal parathyroid gland (right). H&E stain.
- Specialty: Endocrinology

Many conditions are associated with disorders of the function of the parathyroid gland. Some disorders may be purely anatomical resulting in an enlarged gland which will raise concern. Such benign disorders, such as parathyroid cyst, are not discussed here. Parathyroid diseases can be divided into those causing hyperparathyroidism, and those causing hypoparathyroidism.

== Comparison ==
Condition	Calcium	Parathyroid hormone
primary hyperparathyroidism	high	high
primary hypoparathyroidism	low	low
secondary hyperparathyroidism	normal	high
pseudohypoparathyroidism	low	high

== Hyperparathyroidism and related conditions ==
The single major disease of parathyroid glands is overactivity of one or more of the parathyroid lobes, which make too much parathyroid hormone, causing a potentially serious calcium imbalance. This is called hyperparathyroidism; it leads to hypercalcemia, kidney stones, osteoporosis, and various other symptoms. Hyperparathyroidism was first described in 1925, and the symptoms have collectively become known as "moans, groans, stones, and bones." By far, the most common symptom is fatigue, but depression, memory loss, and bone aches are also very common. Primary hyperparathyroidism is relatively more common in postmenopausal women. The primary treatment for this disease is the surgical removal of the faulty gland.

In Continuous ambulatory peritoneal dialysis (CAPD), the lining of the abdomen acts as a natural filter, and dialysis fluid is introduced into and removed from the abdominal cavity through a catheter. While kidney dialysis technicians are not directly involved in the day-to-day administration of CAPD, they play an important role in supporting and educating patients, ensuring they have the knowledge and resources needed to manage their treatment effectively.

If a patient has elevated calcium, several different types of tests can be used to locate the abnormal glands. The most common and most accurate test to find a parathyroid tumor is the Sestamibi scan. The Sestamibi scan does not have high resolution. Neck ultrasound has higher resolution, but requires some expertise to perform. Ultrasound's shortcomings include:

- It cannot determine glandular function (normal vs. hyperfunctioning) or,
- Visualize unusual locations such as retropharyngeal or mediastinal.

Thin cut computed tomography of the neck can reveal glands in locations that the ultrasound cannot evaluate well; e.g. retropharyngeal, mediastinal. These tests are ordered by an endocrinologist or a surgeon that specializes in parathyroid surgery. Often, these "localizing" tests used to "find" the bad parathyroid gland are not successful in locating which parathyroid gland has become a tumor. This often causes confusion for the patient and doctor, since the tumor was not located. This simply means that the tumor was not found using these tests; it does not mean the tumor does not exist. The use of ultrasound-guided FNA, and parathyroid hormone washings can confirm the abnormal glands. For decades, it has been known that the best way to find a parathyroid tumor is through a very experienced parathyroid surgeon.

Even if a patient has a non-localizing Sestamibi scan (a negative sestamibi scan), he/she should almost always have a neck exploration to remove the tumor if he/she has high calcium levels, among other symptoms. Minimally-invasive parathyroid surgery is becoming more available, but, depending on the expertise of the surgeon, the patient may need to have a positive sestamibi scan before a minimally-invasive operation is attempted. Some of the most experienced surgeons perform mini-parathyroid surgery on all patients, but this is available only at highly specialized centers. Some patients will need both sides of their necks explored to find the dysfunctional gland(s).

Another related condition is called secondary hyperparathyroidism (HPT for short), which is common in patients with chronic kidney disease on dialysis. In secondary HPT, the parathyroid glands make too much parathyroid hormone (PTH) because the kidneys have failed, and the calcium and phosphorus are out of balance. Even though one may not have any symptoms, treating secondary HPT is important. Cinacalcet (Sensipar) is a medicine that can help treat such dialysis patients and is available by prescription only. Most experts believe that Sensipar should not be used for patients with primary hyperparathyroidism (patients that have a high calcium and are not on kidney dialysis).

Parathyroid surgery is usually performed when there is hyperparathyroidism. This condition causes many diseases related with calcium reabsorption, because the principal function of the parathyroid hormone is to regulate it. Parathyroid surgery could be performed in two different ways: first is a complete parathyroidectomy, and second is the auto transplantation of the removed parathyroid glands. There are various conditions that can indicate the need for the removal or transplant of the parathyroid glands. Hyperparathyroidism is a condition caused by overproduction of PTH, and can be divided into three types.

- Primary hyperparathyroidism happens when the normal mechanism of regulation by negative feedback of calcium is interrupted, or in other words the amount of blood calcium would ordinarily signal less production of PTH. Most of the time this is caused by adenomas, hyperplasia or carcinomas.
- Secondary hyperparathyroidism normally occurs in patients that suffer chronic kidney disease. Poor kidney function leads to a mineral disequilibrium that causes the glands hypertrophy in order to synthesize and release more PTH.
- Tertiary hyperparathyroidism develops when the hyperplastic gland of secondary hyperparathyroidism constantly releases PTH, independent of the regulation systems.

Another condition is hypercalcemia, which refers to a calcium level above 10.5 mg/dL. Consequences of this are heart rhythm diseases, and extra production of gastrin that causes peptic ulcers.

Parathyroid transplant is recommended if the parathyroid glands are removed accidentally during a thyroidectomy. They are autotransplanted to the nearby sternocleidomastoid muscle, or to the forearm so that another intervention would be less risky. A biopsy is recommended to be sure that the transplanted tissue is parathyroid and not a lymph node with metastatic disease. During parathyroid surgery if there is an adenoma the transplantation is not recommended; instead it is cryopreserved for research an if there is a recurrent hypoparathyroidism.

The surgery is indicated for all patients that are diagnosed with hyperparathyroidism with or without symptoms, especially in younger patients. In some cases the surgery works as therapy for nephrolithiasis, bone changes, and neuromuscular symptoms.

=== Procedure ===
Parathyroidectomy, or the removal of the parathyroids, requires general anesthesia. The patient is intubated and placed in a supine position with the chin at fifteen degrees by elevating the shoulders to permit the extension of the neck. Then a transverse cut is made above the sternal notch. The transversal thyroid lobe is reached and is rotated up to discover and ligate the thyroid vein to separate the thyroid artery. Exploration must be done meticulously to search for adenomas. If an adenoma is identified, exploration must be continued because it is common that more than one neoplasia appears. Before the procedure, the glands are marked to make them more visible during the procedure. If one of them cannot be found, the procedure is to remove a complete thyroid lobe on the side where the gland is not found to avoid an intrathyroid parathyroid gland. After exploration, if there is one, two or even three parathyroid glands affected, they are removed and the other one left in situ. If all four glands are affected then three and a half are removed. The remaining half is marked with a suture and the surgeon must be sure that the blood supply will not be compromised. A total parathyroidectomy or auto transplantation to the forearm of the remaining half gland, may also be recommended.

=== Parathyroid auto transplantation ===
Parathyroid auto transplantation is part of the treatment when a patient has hyperparathyroidism and three or four parathyroid glands were already removed, but during the surgery one of the glands (in the case of the removal of three) is relocated at another part of the body to make, the procedure less risky another procedure. In the case of complete parathyroidectomy, a half gland is cryopreserved. In case the patient suffers hypoparathyroidism. If this happens the extracted parathyroid is relocated to another place of the body for example the forearm. Parathyroid auto transplantation begins with parathyroid tissue extraction, which must be preserved into a cold isotonic solution until the patient needs it. Research has shown that parathyroid tissue can function at subcutaneous level until the transplantation. If this is not possible, the most common procedure is to create a small pocket of muscle, tissue at least 2 cm deep by separating the muscular fibers. Then the parathyroid tissue is placed into and closed by suturing the area. After the extraction the tissue might be processed at the laboratory, as soon as possible. Once at the laboratory the tissue sample is placed at a frozen petri dish where it is cut into small pieces (approximately 1–2 mm). The small pieces are placed into test tubes and filled with a solution in three parts one at 20% of autologous serum (about 0.6 ml) and the other part of isotonic solution at 20% (about 0.6 ml) then a solution of 2 ml of polypropylene and mixed gently. Then is placed into a container at -70 °C for a night then finally the container passes through the phase of liquid or vapor nitrogen immersion and is kept there until needed. When it is needed the sample is taken out of the nitrogen and placed into a bath of water at 37 °C until the ice is melted almost completely except for the samples core. Then 0.5 ml of the melted solution is removed and replaced for fresh isotonic solution.

== Related conditions ==
- Hypoparathyroidism
- Pseudohypoparathyroidism
- Pseudopseudohypoparathyroidism
- Disorders of the parathyroid hormone receptor have been associated with Jansen's metaphyseal chondroplasia and Blomstrand's chondroplasia
- Parathyroid carcinoma
