= Parathyroidectomy =

Surgical removal of one or more parathyroid glands

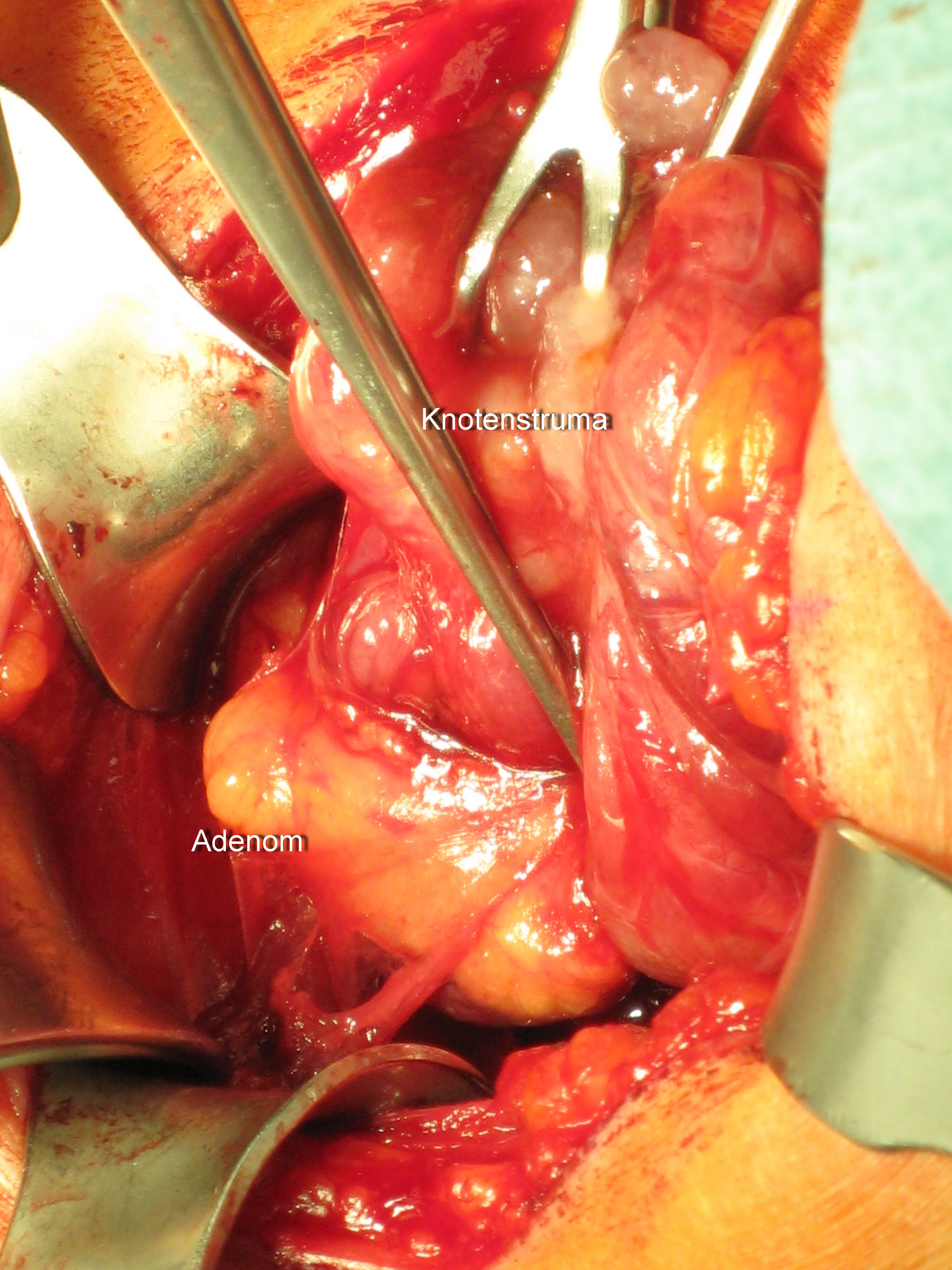
- Parathyroidectomy for parathyroid adenoma
- Specialty: General surgery, endocrine surgery
- Complications: Hypoparathyroidism
- Approach: Open
- Other options: Calcimimetics

Parathyroidectomy is the surgical removal of one or more of the (usually) four parathyroid glands. This procedure is used to remove an adenoma or hyperplasia of these glands when they are producing excessive parathyroid hormone (PTH), a condition termed hyperparathyroidism. The glands are usually four in number and located adjacent to the posterior surface of the thyroid gland, but their exact location is variable. When an elevated PTH level is found, a sestamibi scan or an ultrasound may be performed in order to confirm the presence and location of abnormal parathyroid tissue.

== Indications ==
The main indication for parathyroidectomy is primary hyperparathyroidism, a condition in which one or more of the parathyroid glands produce excessive parathyroid hormone. Not all cases of primary hyperparathyroidism require surgery, but it is recommended if the condition causes significant symptoms or if it affects the kidneys (nephrocalcinosis) or bone health (osteoporosis), and also in people under 50 even if they do not have symptoms.‍ It is not always possible to anticipate if a parathyroid tumor is malignant (i.e. capable of invading other tissues or spreading elsewhere). Any suspicion of parathyroid carcinoma is therefore also an indication for surgery.‍

Parathyroidectomy may also be required in secondary hyperparathyroidism. This situation arises mainly in people with severe chronic kidney disease (CKD) in which the parathyroid glands are overactive to compensate for the low calcium (hypocalcemia) and vitamin D (vitamin D deficiency) levels often present in CKD. In many cases, the parathyroid hormone production improves when these abnormalities are treated with medication. A small proportion, however, have persistently raised hormone levels six months after treatment has started, thought to be autonomous production of hormone by the glands and loss of feedback mechanisms. In this situation surgical parathyroidectomy may be required, especially if calcium and phosphate levels remain elevated (respectively, hypercalcemia and hyperphosphatemia), there is calcium deposition in the wall of blood vessels (calciphylaxis in severe cases) or there is worsening bone disease. In people on kidney dialysis, parathyroidectomy can improve survival. It does appear that the procedure may be underused.‍

== Procedure ==
The operation requires general anesthesia (unconscious and pain-free) or local anesthesia (pain-free). The surgeon makes an incision around 2 1/2 centimetres (1 inch) long in the neck just under the larynx ("Adam's apple"), and locates the offending parathyroid glands. Preoperative testing using sestamibi scanning can help identify the location of glands. It can also be used to limit the extent of surgical exploration when used in conjunction with intraoperative parathyroid hormone (PTH) monitoring.‍ The particular problem or disease process will determine how many of the parathyroid glands are removed. Some parathyroid tissue must be left in place to help prevent hypoparathyroidism. Methylene blue can be used during the procedure to help identify parathyroid glands.

Recovery after the operation tends to be swift. The PTH level is back to normal within 10 to 15 minutes, and can be confirmed by intraoperative rapid assessment during the operation. However, the remaining parathyroid glands may take hours to several weeks to return to their normal functioning levels (as they may have become dormant). Calcium supplements are therefore often required to prevent symptoms of hypocalcemia and to restore lost bone mass.‍

The patient is placed in a semi-Fowler position and the neck is extended. An abbreviated Kocher incision is made and the platysma muscle is dissected horizontally. The strap muscles are released off of the thyroid gland. Then the thyroid gland is mobilized and the parathyroid arterial blood supply is suture ligated. The entire parathyroid adenoma is identified and dissected out. Intraoperative PTH monitoring can begin at this time and will show falling PTH levels if the entire adenoma has been resected.‍

== Complications ==
Parathyroidectomy often lacks complications. Rarely, complications relating to the wound may occur. Complications relating to operative strategy, pathology, and failure to find an adenoma are complex and difficult to address.

While mild hypocalcemia is common after partial parathyroidectomy, some people experience persistently prolonged low calcium levels. This is called hungry bone syndrome. In such a scenario, despite reactivation of unresected parathyroid glands producing normal-to-elevated levels of parathyroid hormone, serum calcium continues to be low. The balance between calcium influx and efflux within the bone continues to be disrupted, favoring the former. The bone is said to be "hungry" as it consumes minerals without regard to parathyroid hormone levels; calcium, magnesium, and phosphate continue to be deposited into the bones, resulting in ongoing hypocalcemia, hypomagnesemia, and hypophosphatemia. Prolonged calcium supplementation may be required. Hungry bone syndrome is particularly common in people who are on long-term kidney dialysis.‍‍

Voice changes can also occur if the recurrent laryngeal nerves are injured during surgery. Damage can be temporary, with a risk of 4-6% of cases, or permanent, with a risk of ~2%, and cause swallowing difficulties alongside changes such as hoarse or weak voice.

== See also ==
- Parathyroid disease
- Parathyroid hormone
- Thyroidectomy
- Vocal cord paresis – potential surgical complication
- List of surgeries by type
