= Chief cell =

Chief cell may refer to:

- Gastric chief cell, a type of stomach cell
- Parathyroid chief cell, the main cell type of the parathyroid gland
- Type I chief cells of the carotid bodies
