= Calcium α-ketoglutarate =

Chemical compound

Names
- IUPAC name Calcium 2-oxopentanedioate
- Other names Calcium oxoglurate; CaAKG; Ca-AKG

Identifiers
CAS Number	71686-01-6
3D model (JSmol)	Interactive image
ECHA InfoCard	100.068.927
PubChem CID	3018235
UNII	95PE00B13W
CompTox Dashboard (EPA)	DTXSID00992299
- SMILES: C(CC(=O)[O-])C(=O)C(=O)[O-].[Ca+2]

Properties
Chemical formula	C_{5}H_{4}CaO_{5}
Molar mass	184.160 g·mol^{−1}
- Except where otherwise noted, data are given for materials in their standard state (at 25 °C [77 °F], 100 kPa). Infobox references

Calcium α-ketoglutarate is a calcium salt of α-ketoglutaric acid. It has been studied as a treatment for hyperparathyroidism.
