= Sestamibi scan =

A sestamibi scan is a medical imaging technique using gamma rays from the radioactive decay of the manmade compound Technetium (99mTc) sestamibi to penetrate muscle and other tissue to view their condition and function. It may refer specifically to:

- MIBI scan, a type of cardiac imaging to assess the condition and function of the heart
- Sestamibi parathyroid scintigraphy, a type of imaging used to assess the condition and function of the parathyroid gland
- Sestamibi scintimammography, breast imaging with sestamibi (Miraluma test)
