= Racquet nail =

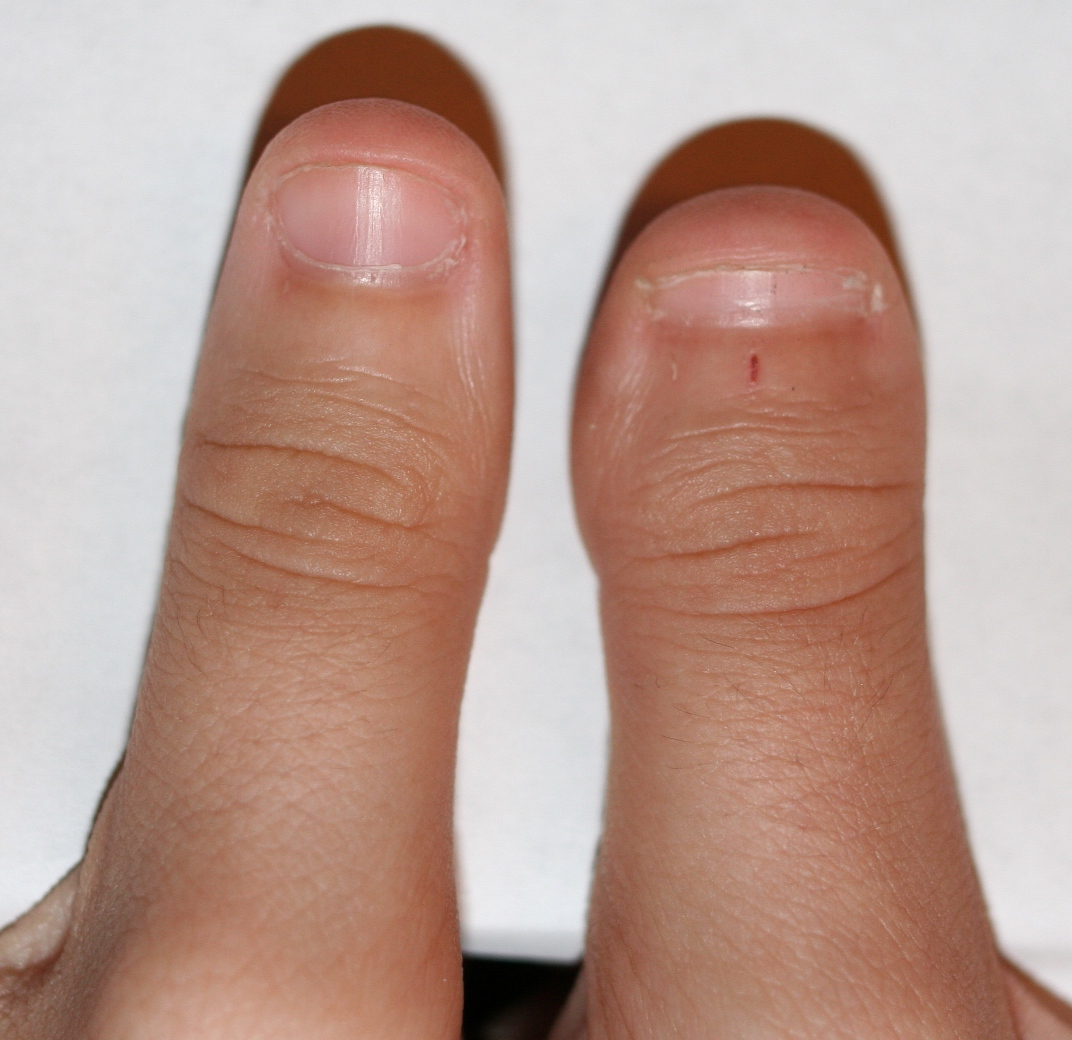
- Brachyonychia in Brachydactyly type D
- Specialty: Dermatology

In racquet nails (also known as brachyonychia, nail en raquette, and racquet thumb), the nail plate is flattened, the end of the thumb is widened and flattened, and the distal phalanx is abnormally short. In racquet nails, the width of the nail bed and nail plate is greater than their length. The condition is painless and asymptomatic.

Racquet nails usually occur on one or both thumbs, but may appear on all fingers and toes. It may be genetic, inherited as an autosomal-dominant trait, or acquired. Genetic disorders associated with racquet nail include Larsen syndrome, Brooke–Spiegler syndrome, Rubinstein–Taybi syndrome, Hajdu–Cheney syndrome, cartilage–hair hypoplasia, pycnodysostosis, acrodysostosis, and brachydactyly type D.

Acquired racquet nail is associated with acroosteolysis and psoriatic arthropathy. Acquired racquet nail may also be diagnostic of bone resorption in hyperparathyroidism.

Racquet nail often presents with other nail conditions such as onycholysis, koilonychia, pachyonychia, Muehrcke's lines, leuconychia, and half-and-half nails. Cosmetic surgery can be used to improve the appearance of the nails.

== See also ==
- Nail anatomy
- List of cutaneous conditions
