= Parathyroid chief cell =

Cell type of the parathyroid gland

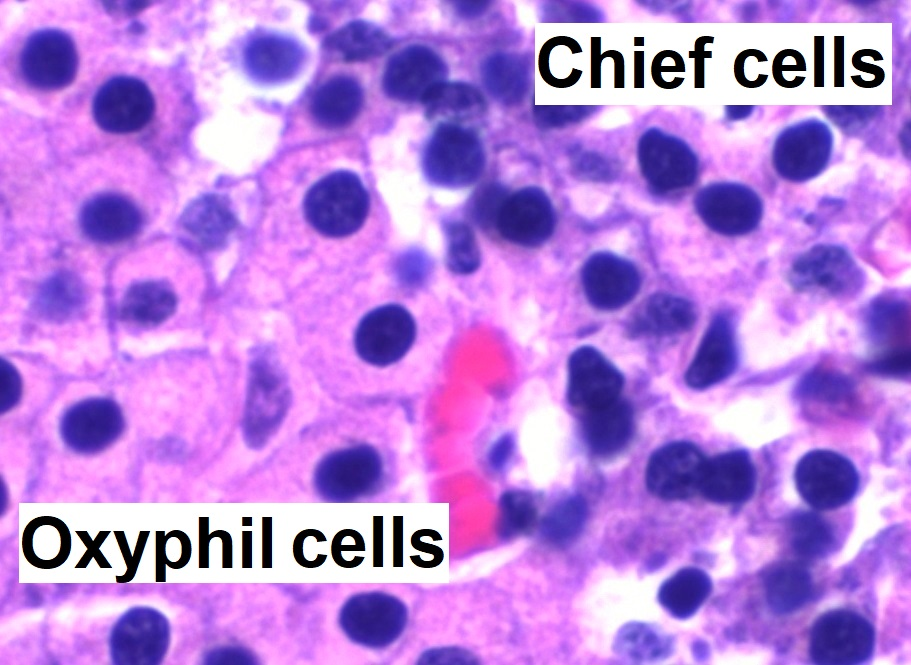
- Micrograph of a parathyroid gland. H&E stain.

Details
- Location: Parathyroid gland

Identifiers
- TH: H3.08.02.5.00002
- FMA: 69078

Parathyroid chief cells (also called parathyroid principal cells or simply parathyroid cells) are the primary cell type of the parathyroid gland. They produce and secrete parathyroid hormone (PTH) in response to low calcium levels. PTH plays an important role in regulating blood calcium levels by raising the amount of calcium in the blood.

Parathyroid chief cells are much more prevalent in the parathyroid gland than the oxyphil cells. Oxyphil cells may be derived from chief cells at puberty, as they are not present at birth like chief cells.

Most individuals display four parathyroid glands adjacent to the thyroid gland anterior in the neck.

== Histology ==
The chief cells are organized as dense cords surrounding the capillaries in the parathyroid. Parathyroid chief cells make up the majority of the parathyroid gland along with adipocytes and oxyphil cells. Parathyroid chief cells have large amounts of organelles associated with protein synthesis. As in many endocrine organs, with age, more oxyphil cells appear in the parathyroid gland. Parathyroid tissue seems to have a low turn-over rate.

Chief cells appear as a dark purple in an H&E stain, with the oxyphil cells staining as a lighter pink. They are polygonal in shape with a round nucleus.

Chief cells spend most time inactive due to normal calcium level conditions. These inactive cells are classified as cuboidal. They have low levels of secretory granules, as opposed to active chief cells. These granules can contain acid phosphatase. Acid phosphatase is only found in larger secretory granules, 400 to 900 nm in diameter, and is less prevalent in smaller granules. This acid phosphatase is also present in the Golgi apparatus of the chief cell. However, the Golgi apparatus areas associated with parathyroid hormone packaging contained little or no acid phosphatase. The chief cells become active in response to low calcium in the blood. The low level is sensed by the calcium- sensing receptor. These active cells have a greater electron density than the inactive chief cells. The electron density is caused by the secretory granules. The chief cell is thought to have a clear cytoplasm.

== Function ==
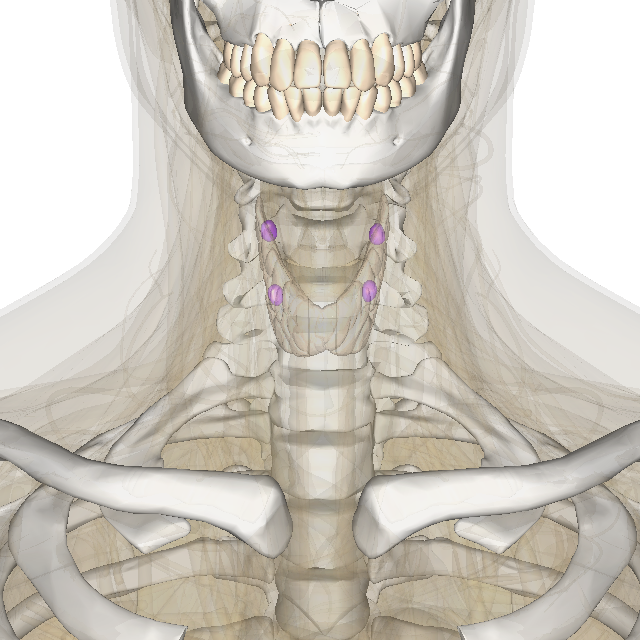
The four parathyroid glands are embedded in the thyroid gland.

The chief cells of the parathyroid glands sense the amount of calcium in the blood, and release the calcium-increasing hormone parathyroid hormone (PTH) accordingly to correct or maintain normal blood calcium levels. It therefore regulates calcium metabolism as part of the endocrine system. PTH raises calcium levels by releasing calcium from bone storage, as well as retaining calcium from the urine, and alerts the intestines to absorb more calcium from ingested nutrients. Too much of either hormone can be an indicator of disease.

=== Calcium-sensing receptor (CaR) ===
The secretion of parathyroid hormone (PTH) is regulated by the interaction of the calcium-sensing receptor with calcium in the blood. The calcium-sensing receptor is present on the plasma membrane of the chief cells. The CaR is a G protein-coupled receptor, as part of the C family. The CaR is divided into three general domains. These include an NH_{2}-terminal extracellular end, a COOH-terminal intracellular end, and seven transmembrane domains. The CaR interacts positively with phospholipase C (PLC) and adenylyl cyclase. The CaR includes phosphorylation sites for protein kinase C (PKC) and protein kinase A (PKA). The phosphorylation of the PLC is seen to inhibit the secretion of PTH due to high calcium levels in the blood. The function of the PKA sites is currently unknown.

== Clinical significance ==
=== Hyperparathyroidism ===
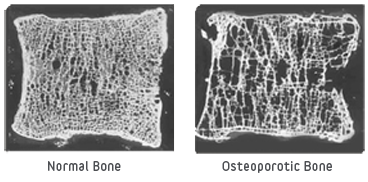
Osteoporotic bone is largely decreased in strength and increased in porosity due to the loss in calcium.

Because the formation of PTH regulates the calcium level in the blood, it can affect all areas of the body. The overactivity of a parathyroid gland is known as hyperparathyroidism. It is unknown what directly causes hyperparathyroidism. However there are many factors that can cause over-secretion of PTH. The further consequence of this disorder can be osteopenia, or even osteoporosis, which is the loss of bone density. This leaves bones more porous, fragile, and likely to experience fracture. This can be detected by usage of dual-energy X-ray absorptiometry (DEXA). Interesting enough, a derivative of synthetic PTH is often given to patients with osteoporosis to combat the disease.

=== Vitamin D deficiency ===
Vitamin D in the kidney assists in the absorption of calcium in the blood. Some individuals may be vitamin D deficient, which prevents them from retaining calcium. While their parathyroid gland is functional, it senses a very low level of calcium in the blood and constantly secretes hormone, increasing PTH levels.

=== Medications ===
There are many drugs that can affect calcium level in the blood, and therefore PTH secretion. For example, many individuals may take a calcium carbonate supplement, which increases the calcium level in the blood. PTH is decreased. Many medications may also increase urination, furthering loss of calcium.

=== Parathyroid adenoma ===
A parathyroid adenoma is the most common cause of hyperparathyroidism. They are more commonly found in women than in men. In this form, the chief cells mutate to exhibit multiple nuclei. Chief cells in parathyroid adenomas also display acid phosphatase activity. It is a benign tumor of the gland that requires surgical removal. These benign adenomas are typically affect only one or two of the parathyroid glands, known respectively as a single adenoma or double adenoma. Typically, no disease is linked to the cause. A primary adenoma can only develop as a primary cause.

=== Chief cell hyperplasia ===
In many way, chief cell hyperplasia is similar to parathyroid adenoma. The hyperplasia is seen as an enlargement of all four of the parathyroid glands, as opposed to a parathyroid adenoma is viewed as an enlargement of one gland. Chief cell hyperplasia is a common disorder in individuals with other endocrine abnormalities, though it may still occur sporadically. A chief cell hyperplasia can develop from either a primary or secondary cause.

=== Parathyroid carcinoma ===
In extremely rare cases, a malignant tumor may develop within the parathyroid gland. They can be detected intraoperatively, imaging, or through blood testing. A thick fibrous capsule is usually present around the gland, as opposed to the thin capsule present in benign adenomas. Parathyroid hormone level is often greater in carcinomas than in benign disorders.

=== Hypoparathyroidism ===
There are very few cases of hypoparathyroidism. Most often, it is related with surgical removal of the parathyroid glands. It can also be due to a head or neck injury and further loss of function of the glands. Hypoparathyroidism can also be linked to a low serum magnesium level in the blood. Serum magnesium is necessary for full secretion of PTH. Without the parathyroid glands, there is no trigger to release calcium into the blood. Another consequence of hypoparathyroidism is the lack of calcium in the blood to trigger muscle contraction. Without calcium present, muscles innervation is unable to take place. This is especially crucial in the function of the most important muscle of the body – the heart.

== See also ==
- Oxyphil cell (parathyroid)
- List of human cell types derived from the germ layers
- List of distinct cell types in the adult human body
