= Giulio Vassale =

Italian pathologist

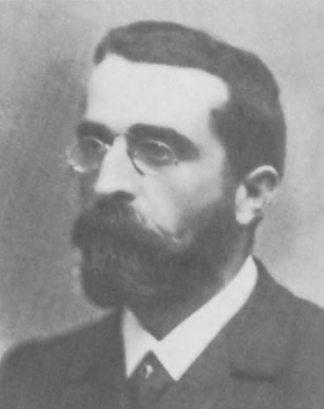

Giulio Vassale (22 June 1862 – 3 January 1913) was an Italian pathologist and pioneer of endocrinology. He demonstrated the existence and distinctness in function of the gland found next to the thyroid, the parathyroid gland, and was among the first to connect pancreatic functions with sugar metabolism.

Vassale was born in Lerici and went to the University of Modena but transferred to Turin where he graduated in medicine in 1887. He studied under Giulio Bizzozero and for his doctorate he demonstrated that dog gastric glands were regenerated after a careful aseptic excision. He then studied neurology and secretions of glands. He worked as a pathologist at the Psychiatric Institute of Reggio Emilia before he went to Modena to teach pathology in 1894 becoming a full professor in 1898. He refused to take up a position at the University of Turin where he was to replace the position made vacant by the death of Bizzozero. He however preferred not to take it as it involved administrative work and stayed on at Modena. Along with his assistant Francesco Generali he conducted dissections of the glands next to the thyroid and found that they had a specific role, causing tetany when removed. In other experiment, he ligated the Wirsung's duct of the pancreas of a dog and examined its effects noting that when the Islets of Langerhans were undamaged, there was no glycosuria. He demonstrated that extracts from thyroid glands suppressed the effects of thyroid gland removal. Vassale and Generali however believed that the parathyroid gland produced substances that helped detoxify some toxic metabolites.

He died of cancer aged fifty.
