= Acroosteolysis =

Resorption of hand bones into the blood

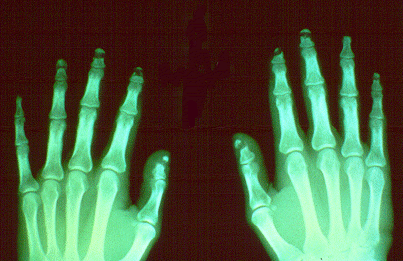
Early changes of acroosteolysis can be detected by x-ray. In this radiograph there is dissolution and fragmentation of the bone in several of the terminal phalanges.~CDC

Acroosteolysis is resorption of the distal bony phalanges. Acroosteolysis has two patterns of resorption in adults: diffuse and bandlike.

The diffuse pattern of resorption has a widely diverse differential diagnosis which includes: pyknodysostosis, collagen vascular disease and vasculitis, Raynaud's neuropathy, trauma, epidermolysis bullosa, psoriasis, frostbite, sarcoidosis, hypertrophic osteoarthropathy, acromegaly, and advanced leprosy.

The bandlike pattern of resorption may be seen with polyvinyl chloride exposure and Hadju-Cheney syndrome.

A mnemonic commonly used for acro-osteolysis is PINCHFO. Pyknodysostosis, Psoriasis, Injury (thermal burn, frostbite), Neuropathy (diabetes), Collagen vascular disease (scleroderma, Raynaud's), Hyperparathyroidism, Familial (Hadju-Cheney, progeria), Occupational (polyvinyl exposure),

Acroosteolysis may be associated with minimal skin changes or with ischemic skin lesions that may result in digital necrosis.

== See also ==
- Nail anatomy
