= Parathyroid adenoma =

Benign tumor of the parathyroid gland

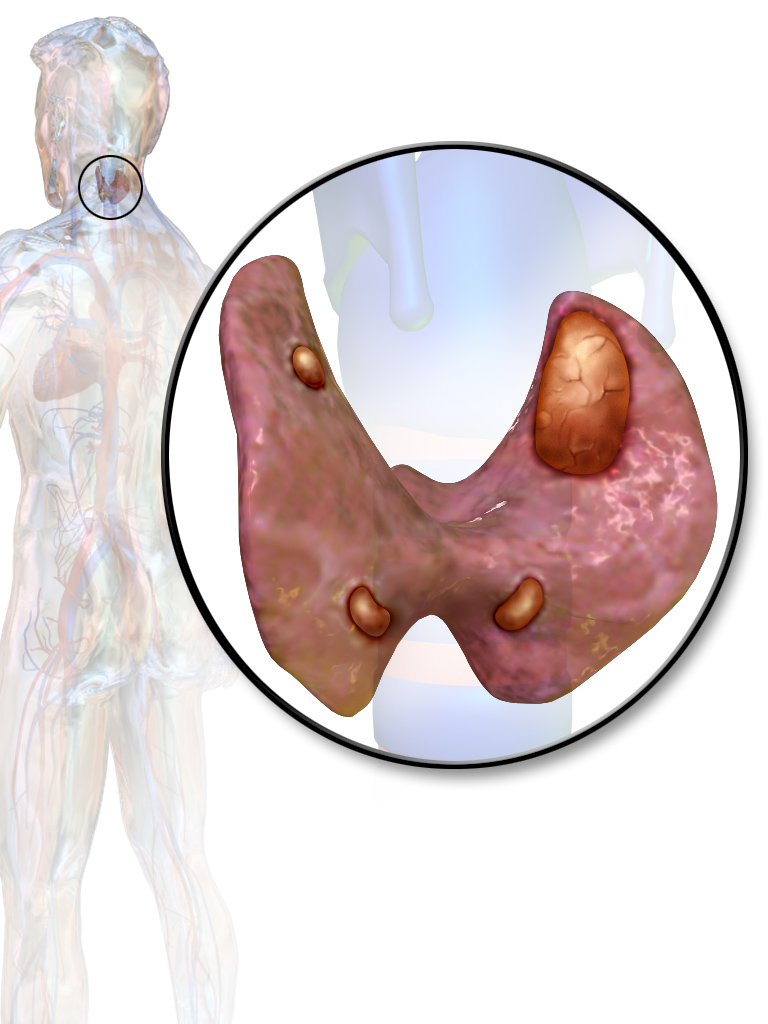
- Parathyroid adenoma
- Specialty: Endocrinology, Otolaryngology

A parathyroid adenoma is a benign tumor of the parathyroid gland. It generally causes hyperparathyroidism; there are very few reports of parathyroid adenomas that were not associated with hyperparathyroidism.

A human being usually has four parathyroid glands located on the posterior surface of the thyroid in the neck. In order to maintain calcium metabolism, the parathyroid glands secrete parathyroid hormone (PTH) which stimulates the bones to release calcium and the kidneys to reabsorb it from the urine into the blood, thereby increasing its serum level. The action of calcitonin opposes PTH. When a parathyroid adenoma causes hyperparathyroidism, more parathyroid hormone is secreted, causing the calcium concentration of the blood to rise, resulting in hypercalcemia.

== Signs and symptoms ==
The first signs of a parathyroid adenoma and the resulting primary hyperparathyroidism can include bone fractures and urinary calculi such as kidney stones.

Often, a parathyroid adenoma is diagnosed by an incidental finding on blood tests that reveal high calcium levels. Patients may not be experiencing any noticeable symptoms but could be producing excessive amounts of calcium and eventually experience problems later in life if untreated. However, if symptomatic, patients can experience: pain or discomfort in the joints, muscles, and abdomen; depression and mood changes due to the hormonal imbalance.; constipation; exhaustion; and kidney damage.

== Genetics ==
Parathyroid adenoma can be associated with overexpression of the cyclin D1 gene. It is also associated with multiple endocrine neoplasia (MEN).

== Diagnosis ==
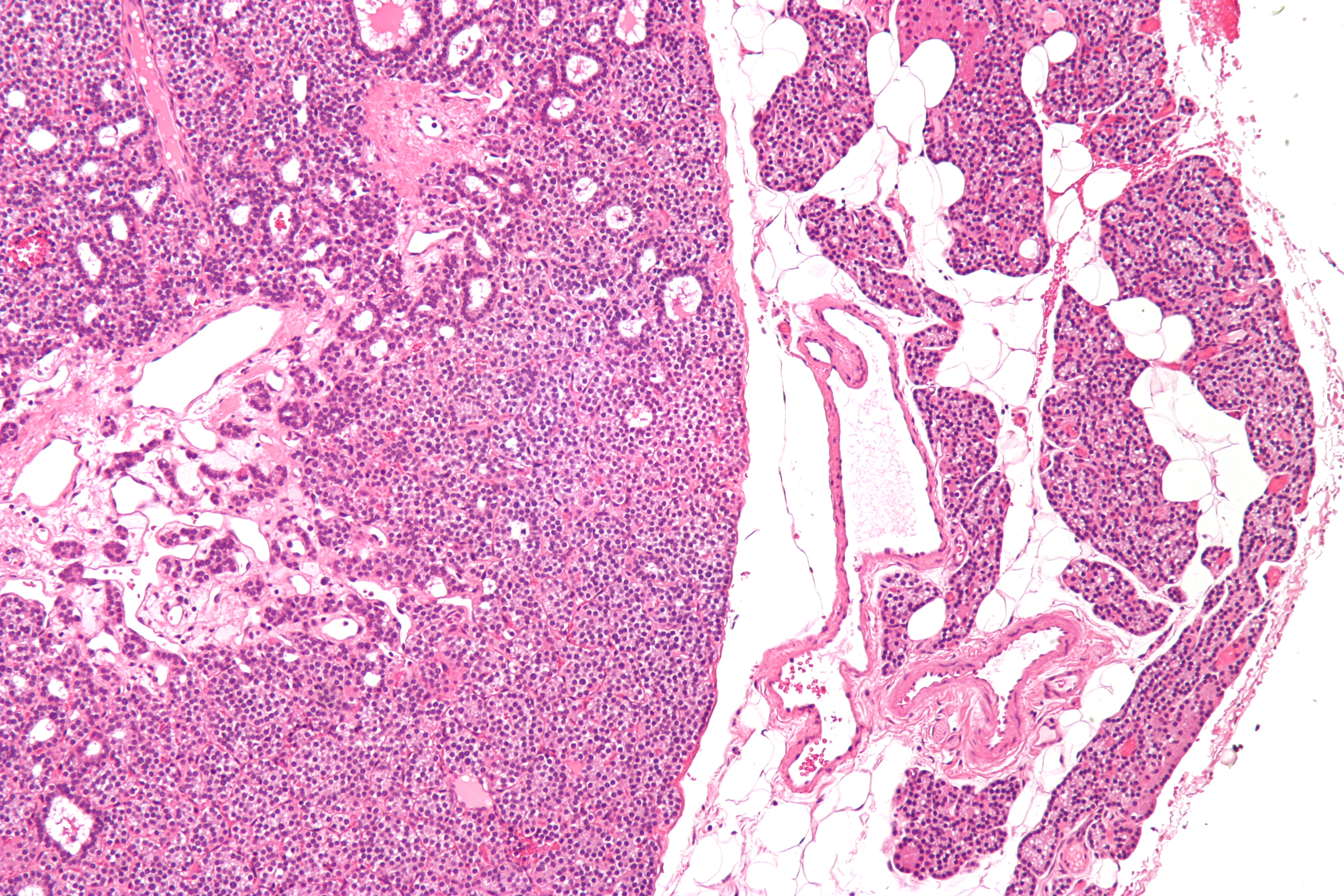
Micrograph of a parathyroid adenoma (left) and normal parathyroid gland (right). H&E stain.

Hyperparathyroidism is confirmed by blood tests such as calcium and PTH levels. A specific test for parathyroid adenoma is sestamibi parathyroid scintigraphy, often referred to as sestamibi scan or, more colloquially, MIBI scan. This nuclear imaging technique reveals the presence and location of pathological parathyroid tissue. In cases where ^{99m}Tc-sestamibi scintigraphy or SPECT delivers inconclusive results, other imaging modalities and tracers can be applied. For detection of multiple parathyroid adenomas, positron emission tomography (PET) using the radiopharmaceutical ^{68}Ga-Trivehexin has demonstrated a higher detection rate (94.1%) than ^{99m}Tc-sestamibi imaging (58.8%). Another retrospective analysis of 38 PHPT patients found a lesion-based detection rate of 98% (49/50) for ^{68}Ga-Trivehexin PET/CT vs 58% (29/50) for ^{99m}Tc-sestamibi.

4DCT is used as second line investigation to diagnose parathyroid adenoma. In addition to the three dimensional imaging of a conventional CT scan, 4DCT provides imaging on the changes of iodinated contrast enhancement over time and present them in a video format (from plain imaging to arterial to venous and delay phases). Parathyroid adenoma would show low density on non contrast image, with peak enhancement during the arterial phase, then slowly fade away until the delay phase.

== Treatment ==
Surgery is the only cure for parathyroid adenomas. It is successful about 95% of the time. Parathyroidectomy is the removal of the affected gland(s). The standard of treatment of primary hyperparathyroidism was formerly a surgical technique called bilateral neck exploration, in which the neck was opened on both sides, the parathyroids were identified, and the affected tissue was removed. By the 1980s, unilateral exploration became more common. Parathyroidectomy can now be performed in a minimally invasive fashion, mainly because imaging techniques can pinpoint the location of the tissue. Minimally invasive techniques include smaller open procedures, radio-guided and video-assisted procedures, and totally endoscopic surgery.

Before surgery is attempted, the affected glandular tissue must be located. Though the parathyroid glands are usually located on the back of the thyroid, their position is variable. Some people have one or more parathyroid glands elsewhere in the neck anatomy or in the chest. About 10% of parathyroid adenomas are ectopic, located not along the back of the thyroid but elsewhere in the body, sometimes in the mediastinum of the chest. This can make them difficult to locate, so various imaging techniques are used, such as the sestamibi scan, single-photon emission computed tomography (SPECT), ultrasound, MRI, and CT scans. sometimes parathyroid adenomas can be ablated by ethanol injection, laser or radiofrequency guided by ultrasound.

== Micrographs ==
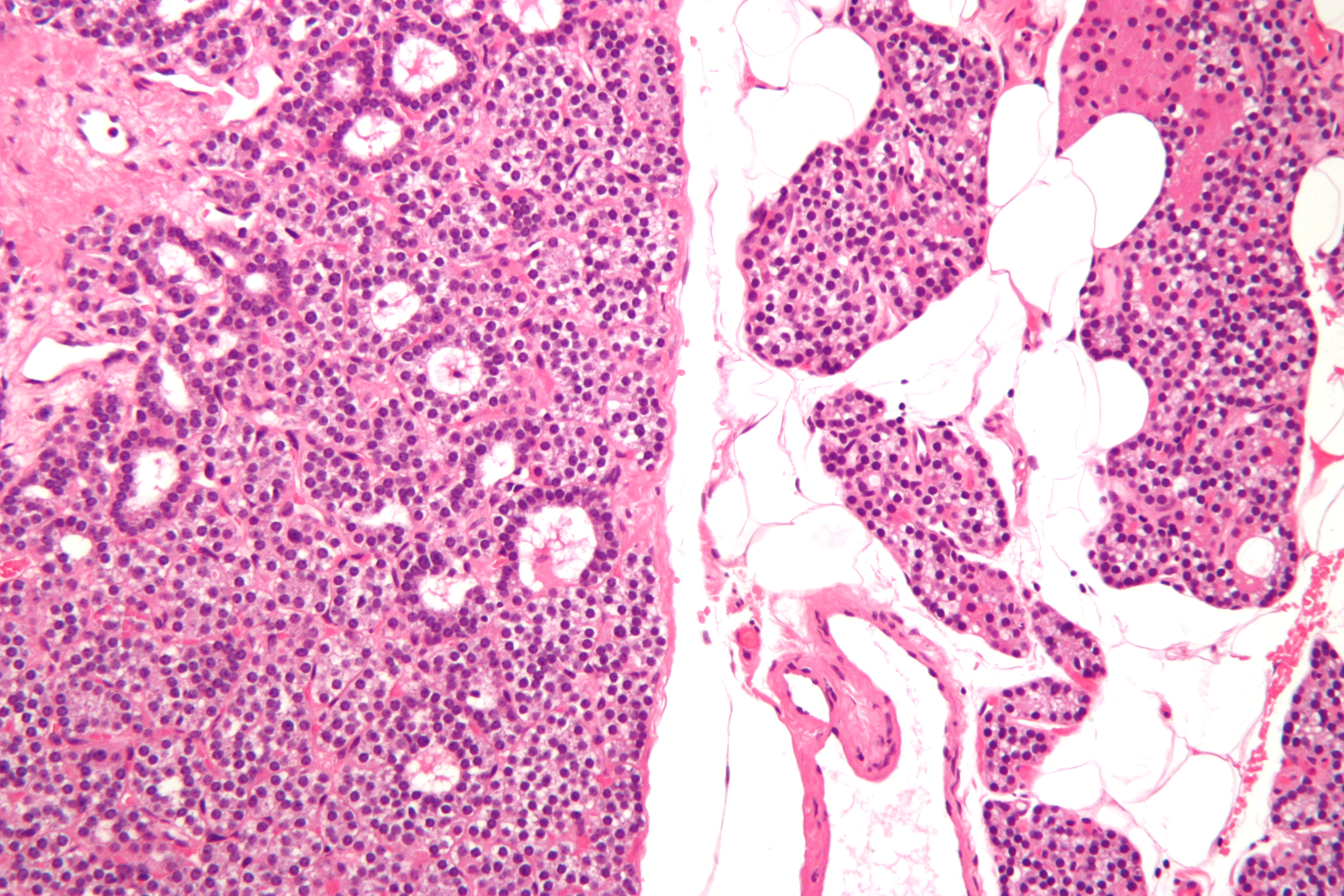

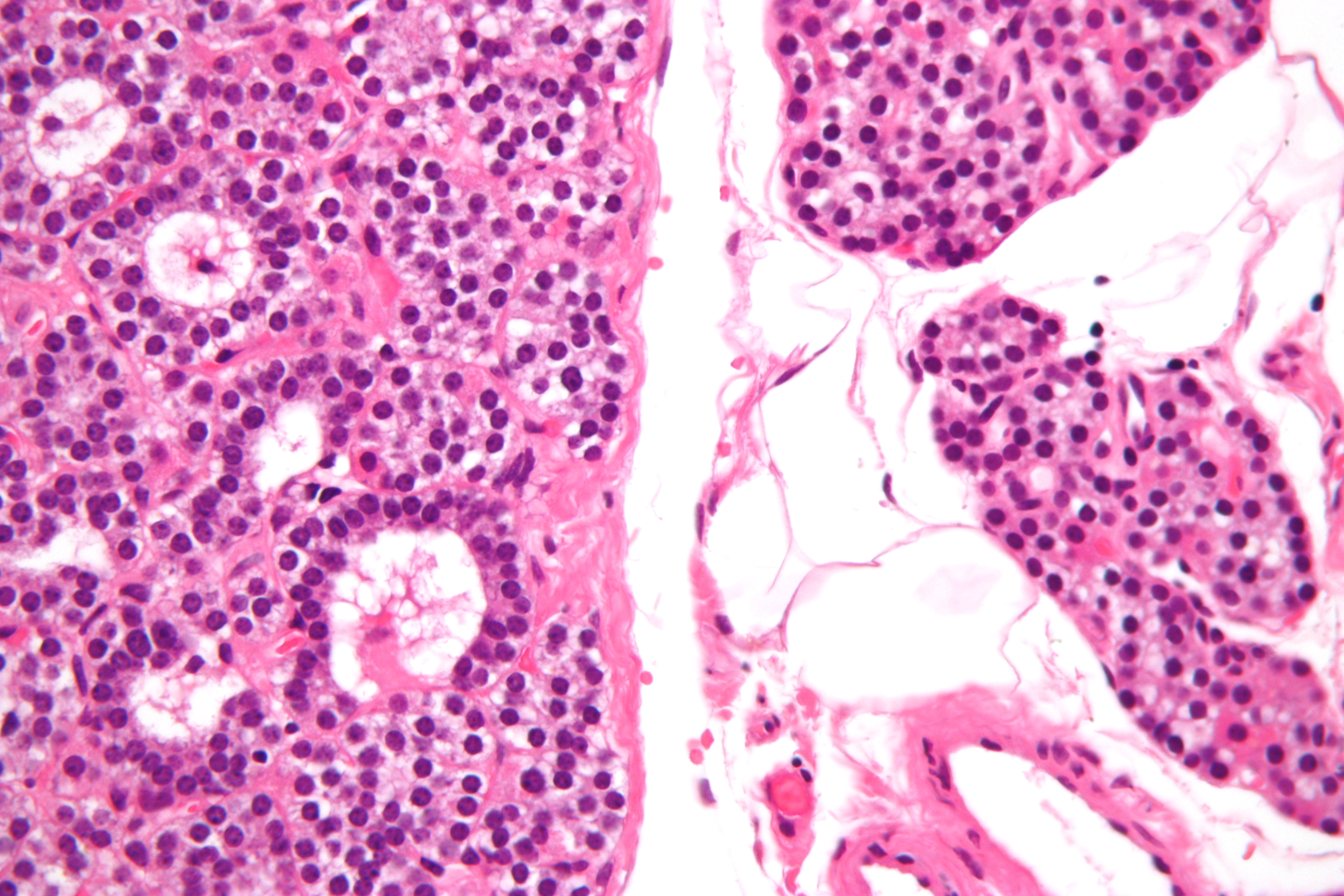

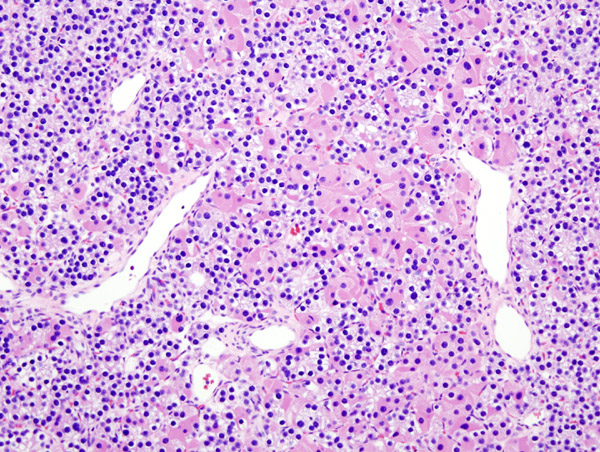

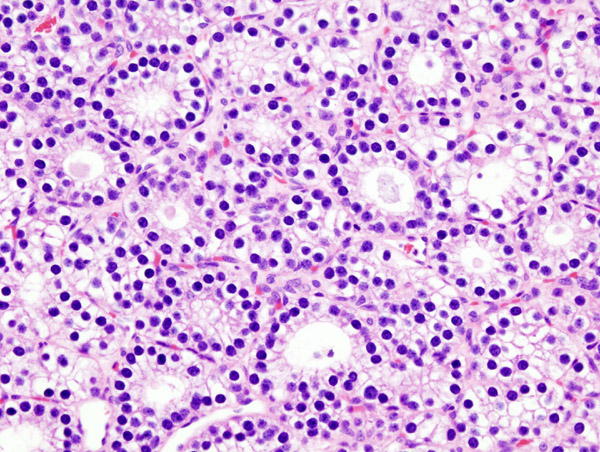

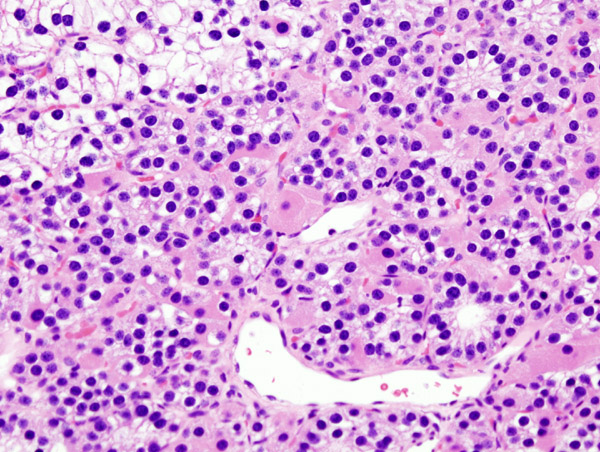

== See also ==
- Endocrine system
- Parathyroid disease
