= Hyperparathyroidism =

Increase in parathyroid hormone levels

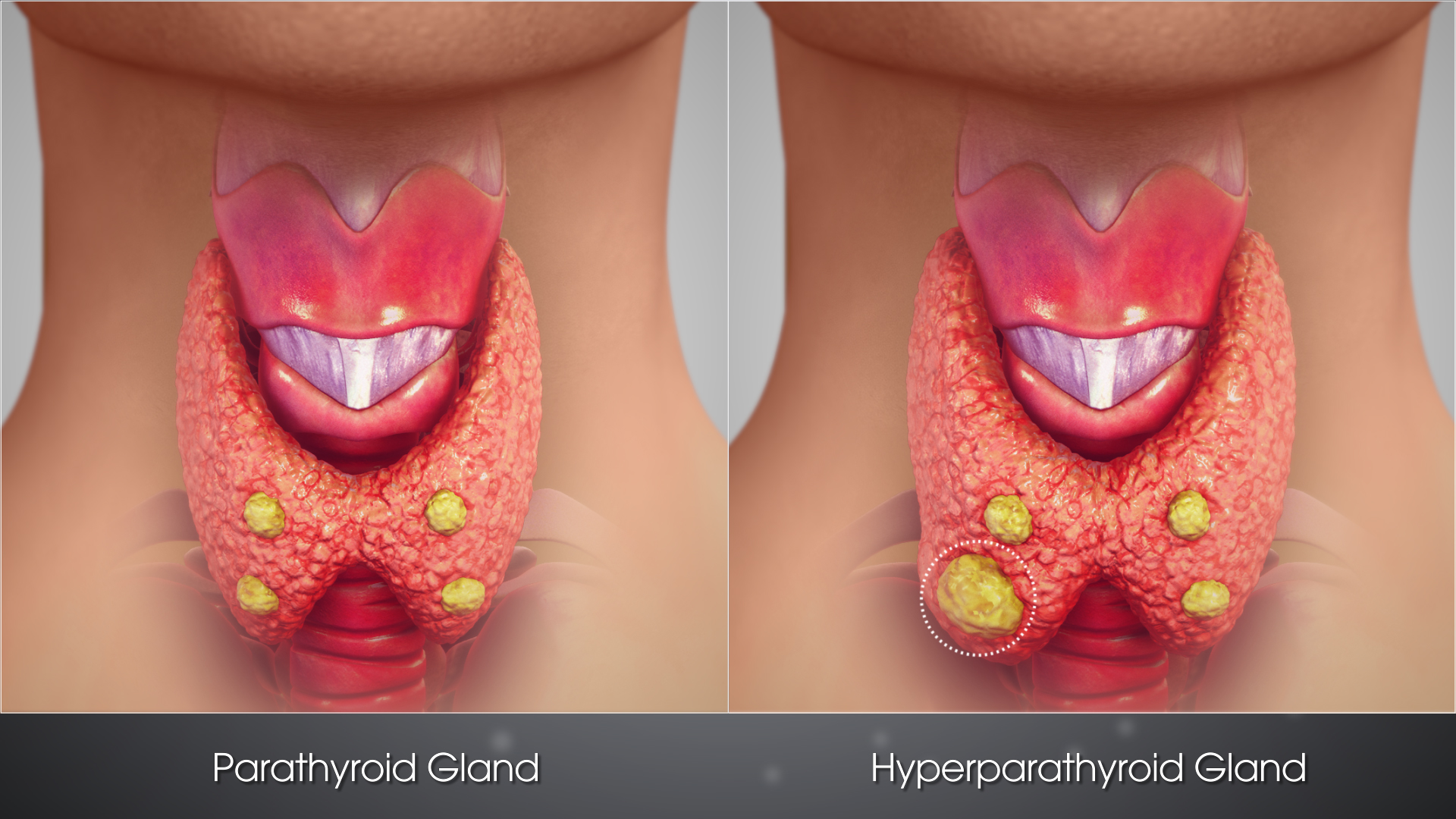
- 3D diagram of hyperparathyroidism
- Specialty: Endocrinology
- Symptoms: None, kidney stones, weakness, depression, bone pains, confusion, increased urination
- Complications: Osteoporosis
- Usual onset: 50 to 60
- Types: Primary, secondary
- Causes: Primary: parathyroid adenoma, multiple benign tumors, parathyroid cancer Secondary: vitamin D deficiency, chronic kidney disease, low blood calcium
- Diagnostic method: High blood calcium and high PTH levels
- Treatment: Monitoring, surgery, intravenous normal saline, cinacalcet
- Frequency: ~2 per 1,000

Hyperparathyroidism is an increase in parathyroid hormone (PTH) levels in the blood. This occurs from a disorder either within the parathyroid glands (primary hyperparathyroidism) or as response to external stimuli (secondary hyperparathyroidism). Symptoms of hyperparathyroidism are caused by inappropriately elevated blood calcium excreted from the bones into the blood stream in response to increased production of parathyroid hormone. In healthy people, when blood calcium levels are high, parathyroid hormone levels should be low. With long-standing hyperparathyroidism, the most common symptom is kidney stones. Other symptoms may include bone pain, weakness, depression, confusion, and increased urination. Both primary and secondary may result in osteoporosis (weakening of the bones).

In 80% of cases, primary hyperparathyroidism is due to a single benign tumor known as a parathyroid adenoma. Most of the remainder are due to several of these adenomas. Very rarely it may be due to parathyroid cancer. Secondary hyperparathyroidism typically occurs due to vitamin D deficiency, chronic kidney disease, or other causes of low blood calcium. The diagnosis of primary hyperparathyroidism is made by finding elevated calcium and PTH in the blood.

Primary hyperparathyroidism may only be cured by removing the adenoma or overactive parathyroid glands, known as parathyroidectoy. In asymptomatic patients who present with mildly elevated blood calcium levels, with otherwise normal kidneys, and with normal bone density, monitoring may be all that is required. The medication cinacalcet may also be used to decrease PTH levels in those unable to have surgery although it is not a cure. In patients with very high blood calcium levels, treatment may include large amounts of intravenous normal saline. Low vitamin D should be corrected in those with secondary hyperparathyroidism but low Vitamin D pre-surgery is controversial for those with primary hyperparathyroidism. Low vitamin D levels should be corrected post-parathyroidectomy.

== Signs and symptoms ==
In primary hyperparathyroidism, about 75% of people are "asymptomatic". While most primary patients are asymptomatic at the time of diagnosis, 'asymptomatic' is poorly defined and represents only those without "obvious clinical sequelae" such as kidney stones, bone disease, or hypercalcemic crisis. These "asymptomatic" patients may have other symptoms such as depression, anxiety, gastrointestinal distress, and neuromuscular problems that are not counted as symptoms. The problem is often picked up incidentally during blood work for other reasons, and the test results show a higher amount of calcium in the blood than normal. Many people only have non-specific symptoms.

Common manifestations of hypercalcemia include constipation, vomiting, weakness, lethargy, fatigue, depression, bone pain, muscle soreness (myalgias), joint pain, decreased appetite, feelings of nausea, abdominal pain, pancreatitis, polyuria, polydipsia, cognitive impairment, kidney stones ( (Note: Although parathyroid hormone (PTH) promotes the reabsorption of calcium from the kidneys' tubular fluid, thus decreasing the rate of urinary calcium excretion, its effect is only noticeable at any given plasma ionized calcium concentration. The primary determinant of the amount of calcium excreted into the urine per day is the plasma ionized calcium concentration. Thus, in primary hyperparathyroidism, the quantity of calcium excreted in the urine per day is increased despite the high levels of PTH in the blood, because hyperparathyroidism results in hypercalcemia, which increases the urinary calcium concentration (hypercalcuria). Kidney stones are, therefore, often a first indication of hyperparathyroidism, especially since the hypercalcuria is accompanied by an increase in urinary phosphate excretion (a direct result of the high plasma PTH levels). Together, the calcium and phosphate tend to precipitate out as water-insoluble salts, which readily form solid "stones".)), vertigo and osteopenia or osteoporosis. A history of acquired racquet nails (brachyonychia) may be indicative of bone resorption. Radiographically, hyperparathyroidism has a pathognomic finding of rugger jersey spine. Parathyroid adenomas are very rarely detectable on clinical examination. Surgical removal of a parathyroid tumor eliminates the symptoms in most patients.

In secondary hyperparathyroidism due to lack of vitamin D absorption, the parathyroid gland is behaving normally; clinical problems are due to bone resorption and manifest as bone syndromes such as rickets, osteomalacia, and renal osteodystrophy.

== Causes ==
Causes of primary hyperparathyroidism include parathyroid adenoma (80% of patients), multiglandular disease usually seen as hyperplasia of the 4 parathyroid glands (15–20% of patients), parathyroid carcinoma (less than 1% of patients). Primary hyperparathyroidism occurs sporadically and most patients do not have a family history. Radiation exposure increases the risk of primary hyperparathyroidism. Additional risk factors include lithium and thiazide diuretics exposure. A number of genetic conditions including multiple endocrine neoplasia syndromes, hyperparathyroidism-jaw tumor syndrome (Kinkor syndrome), familial hypocalciuric hypercalcemia, neonatal severe hyperparathyroidism also increase the risk. Parathyroid adenomas have been linked with DDT although a causal link has not yet been established. The most common causes for secondary hyperparathyroidism include vitamin D deficiency, chronic kidney disease, inadequate calcium intake, malabsorption. Tertiary hyperparathyroidism most commonly occurs from prolonged secondary hyperparathyroidism.

== Development ==
The parathyroid is composed of 4 glands with 2 located superiorly and 2 located inferiorly. The parathyroid glands are located on the posterior thyroid and are derived from the endoderm of the 3rd and 4th pharyngeal pouches. Specifically, the inferior parathyroid glands are derived from the 3rd pharyngeal pouch and the superior parathyroid glands are derived from the 4th pharyngeal pouch dorsal wing. The ultimopharyngeal body is derived from the 4th pharyngeal pouch ventral wing and the parafollicular cells ( C-cells) are derived when the ultimopharyngeal bodies fuse with the posterolateral thyroid. The parathyroid glands separates from the pharyngeal wall and attaches to the posterior thyroid during the 7th week of human embryonic development.

== Mechanism ==
Normal parathyroid glands measure the ionized calcium (Ca^{2+}) concentration in the blood and secrete parathyroid hormone accordingly; if the ionized calcium rises above normal, the secretion of PTH is decreased, whereas when the Ca^{2+} level falls, parathyroid hormone secretion is increased.

=== Regulation of PTH ===
Rapid PTH regulation is controlled by the parathyroid G-protein coupled, calcium sensing receptors which responds to fluctuations in serum calcium levels. Alternatively, prolonged changes in serum calcium influences mRNA-binding proteins altering the encoding of PTH mRNA. There are also calcium independent mechanisms which include repression of PTH transcription through 1α,25-dihydroxyvitamin D binding with the vitamin D receptor. Furthermore, 1α,25-dihydroxyvitamin D also has an impact on the expression of calcium-sensing receptors, indirectly affecting PTH secretion.

Effects of PTH on the Bones

PTH stimulates the bones to release calcium through multiple mechanisms. 1) PTH stimulates osteoblasts which increase expression of RANKL which causes differentiation of the osteoblasts into osteocytes. 2) PTH inhibits secretion of osteoprotegerina to allow for osteoclast differentiation. 3) PTH will also directly activate osteoclasts to cause bone resorption through degradation of hydroxyapatite and organic material. This then causes bone to release calcium into the blood.

Effects of PTH bone resorption

Effects of PTH on the Kidneys

Calcium reabsorption in the nephron occurs in proximal convoluted tubule and at the ascending Loop of Henle. PTH acts on the distal convoluted tubule and collecting duct to increase calcium reabsorption in the nephron. PTH also acts on the proximal convoluted tubule to decrease phosphate reabsorption to lower the serum phosphate. This decreases formation of insoluble calcium phosphate salts leading to an increase in serum ionized calcium.

Effects of PTH on the Small Intestines

PTH stimulates the production of 1-alpha-hydroxylase in the proximal convoluted tubule. This enzyme activation hydroxylates inactive 25-hydroxycholecalciferol to active vitamin D (1, 25 dihydroxycholecalciferol). Active vitamin D allows for calcium absorption through transcellular and paracellular pathways.

Secondary hyperparathyroidism occurs if the calcium level is abnormally low. The normal glands respond by secreting parathyroid hormone at a persistently high rate. This typically occurs when the 1,25 dihydroxyvitamin D_{3} levels in the blood are low and hypocalcemia is present. A lack of 1,25 dihydroxyvitamin D_{3} can result from a deficient dietary intake of vitamin D, or from a lack of exposure of the skin to sunlight, so the body cannot make its own vitamin D from cholesterol. The resulting hypovitaminosis D is usually due to a partial combination of both factors. Vitamin D_{3} (or cholecalciferol) is converted to 25-hydroxyvitamin D (or calcidiol) by the liver, from where it is transported via the circulation to the kidneys, and it is converted into the active hormone, 1,25 dihydroxyvitamin D_{3}. Thus, a third cause of secondary hyperparathyroidism is chronic kidney disease. Here the ability to manufacture 1,25 dihydroxyvitamin D_{3} is compromised, resulting in hypocalcemia.

== Diagnosis ==
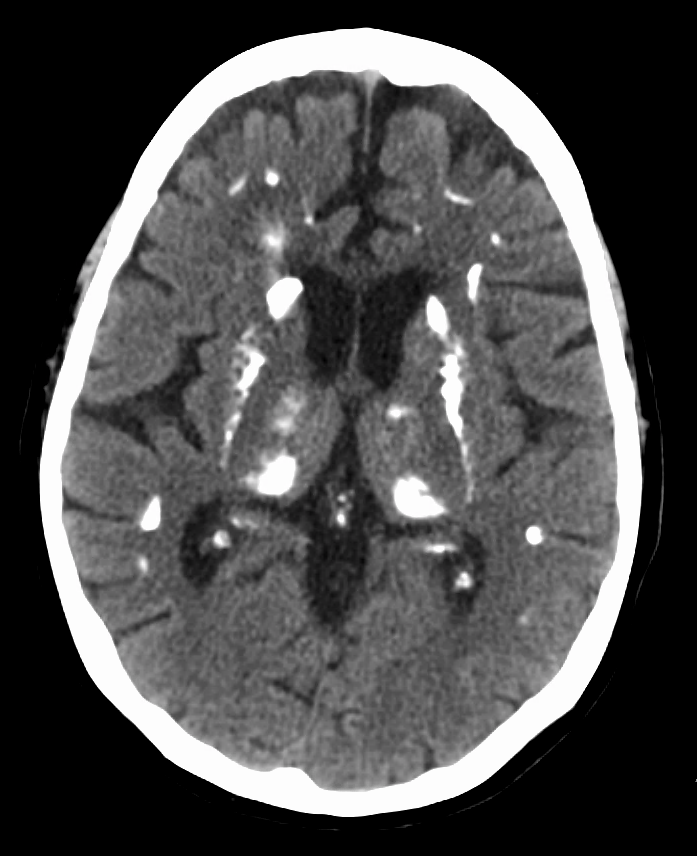
Calcification in the brain due to hyperparathyroidism

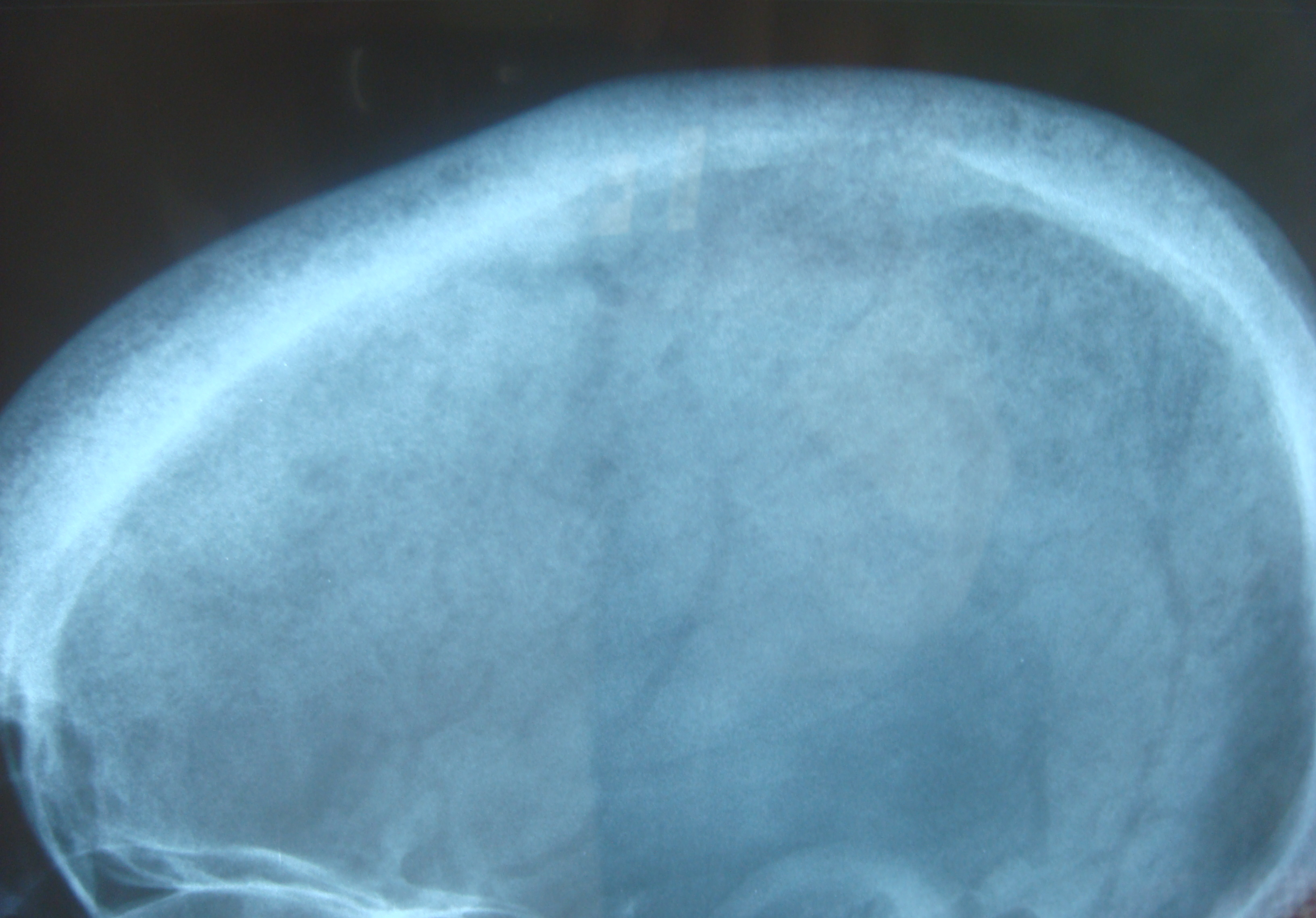
Pepper & Salt, classical X-Ray appearance of hyperparathyroidism

The gold standard of diagnosis is the PTH immunoassay. Once an elevated PTH has been confirmed, the goal of diagnosis is to determine the type of hyperparathyroidism (primary, secondary, or tertiary hyperparathyroidism) by obtaining a serum calcium, phosphate, and PTH levels.

Serum calcium	Phosphate	Vitamin D Level	PTH	Likely type
↑	↓	↑	↑/↔	Primary hyperparathyroidism
↓/↔	↑	↓	↑	Secondary hyperparathyroidism
↑	↑	↓	↑	Tertiary hyperparathyroidism

Primary hyperparathyroidism has high calcium, vitamin D, and PTH levels and a low phosphate level. Secondary hyperparathyroidism has low serum calcium and vitamin D levels, and high phosphate and PTH levels. Tertiary hyperparathyroidism has high serum calcium, phosphate, and PTH and low vitamin D levels. Tertiary hyperparathyroidism is differentiated from primary hyperparathyroidism by a history of chronic kidney failure and secondary hyperparathyroidism.

Hyperparathyroidism can cause hyperchloremia and increase renal bicarbonate loss, which may result in a normal anion gap metabolic acidosis. ALP level can be elevated due to bone turnover. Additionally further tests can be completed to rule out other causes and complications of hyperparathyroidism including a 24-hour urinary calcium for familial hypocalciuric hypercalcemia, DEXA scan to evaluate for osteoporosis, osteopenia, or fragility fractures, and genetic testing. Additionally a CT scan without contrast or renal ultrasound can be done to assess for nephrolithiasis and/or nephrocalcinosis if there is concern for it.

=== Differential diagnosis ===
Differential diagnoses of hypercalcemia include humoral hypercalcemia of malignancy, renal failure, malignant bone destruction (such as multiple myeloma, metastatic breast cancer, lymphoma), thiazide diuretics, lithium, immobilization, hyperthyroidism, milk alkali syndrome, multiple endocrine adenomatosis syndromes, and granulomatous diseases. Additionally, familial benign hypocalciuric hypercalcamia can present with similar lab changes. In this condition, the calcium creatinine clearance ratio, however, is typically under 0.01 due to the low levels urine calcium.

=== Blood tests ===
==== Intact PTH ====
In primary hyperparathyroidism, parathyroid hormone (PTH) levels are either elevated or "inappropriately normal" in the presence of elevated calcium. Typically, PTH levels vary greatly over time in the affected patient and (as with Ca and Ca++ levels) must be retested several times to see the pattern. The currently accepted test for PTH is intact PTH, which detects only relatively intact and biologically active PTH molecules. Older tests often detected other, inactive fragments. Even intact PTH may be inaccurate in patients with kidney dysfunction. Intact PTH blood tests may be falsely low if biotin has been ingested in the previous few days prior to the blood test.

==== Calcium levels ====
In cases of primary hyperparathyroidism or tertiary hyperparathyroidism, heightened PTH leads to increased serum calcium (hypercalcemia) due to:

1. increased bone resorption, allowing the flow of calcium from bone to blood
2. reduced kidney clearance of calcium
3. increased intestinal calcium absorption

==== Serum phosphate ====
In primary hyperparathyroidism, serum phosphate levels are abnormally low as a result of decreased reabsorption of phosphate in the kidney tubules. However, this is only present in about 50% of cases. This contrasts with secondary hyperparathyroidism and tertiary hyperparathyroidism, in which serum phosphate levels are generally elevated because of kidney disease.

==== Alkaline phosphatase ====
Alkaline phosphatase levels are usually high in hyperparathyroidism due to high bone turn over. In primary hyperparathyroidism, levels may remain within the normal range, but this is inappropriately normal given the increased levels of plasma calcium.

=== Nuclear medicine ===
Nuclear medicine imaging methods are used by surgeons to locate which parathyroid gland is responsible for hyperparathyroidism or to find ectopic parathyroid adenomas, most commonly found in the anterior mediastinum. Historically, technetium sestamibi scintigraphy was the main method used or this indication. Recently 18F-fluorocholine PET/CT tend to be more and more performed due to excellent diagnostic performance.

=== Classification ===
==== Primary ====
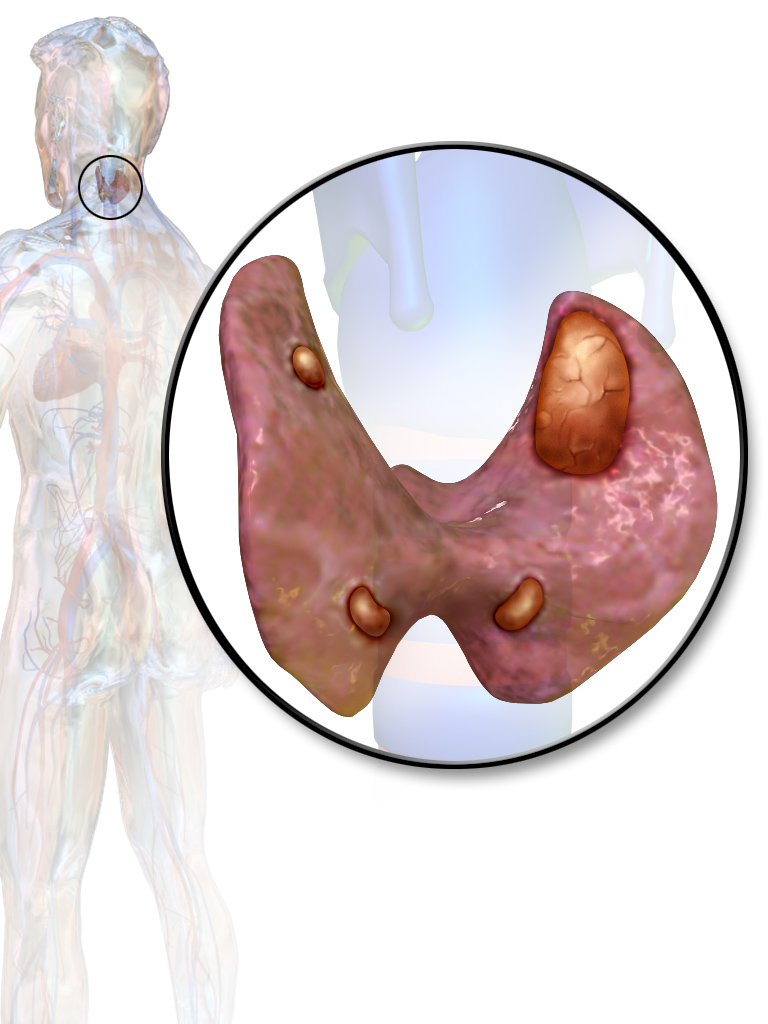
Parathyroid adenoma.

Primary hyperparathyroidism results from a hyperfunction of the parathyroid glands themselves. The oversecretion of PTH is due to a parathyroid adenoma, parathyroid hyperplasia, or rarely, a parathyroid carcinoma. This disease is often characterized by the quartet stones, bones, groans, and psychiatric overtones referring to the presence of kidney stones, hypercalcemia, constipation, and peptic ulcers, as well as depression, respectively.

In a minority of cases, this occurs as part of a multiple endocrine neoplasia (MEN) syndrome, either type 1 (caused by a mutation in the gene MEN1) or type 2a (caused by a mutation in the gene RET), which is also associated with the adrenal tumor pheochromocytoma. Other mutations that have been linked to parathyroid neoplasia include mutations in the genes HRPT2 and CASR.

Patients with bipolar disorder who are receiving long-term lithium treatment are at increased risk for hyperparathyroidism. Elevated calcium levels are found in 15% to 20% of patients who have been taking lithium long-term. However, only a few of these patients have significantly elevated levels of parathyroid hormone and clinical symptoms of hyperparathyroidism. Lithium-associated hyperparathyroidism leads to hypercalcemia in about 4% of lithium-treated patients. Calcium levels should be checked for patients undergoing long-term lithium treatment. Lithium-associated hyperparathyroidism is usually caused by a single parathyroid adenoma.

==== Secondary ====
Secondary hyperparathyroidism is due to physiological (i.e. appropriate) secretion of parathyroid hormone (PTH) by the parathyroid glands in response to hypocalcemia (low blood calcium levels). The most common causes are vitamin D deficiency (caused by lack of sunlight, diet or malabsorption) and chronic kidney failure. Vitamin D deficiency can result from malabsorption or decreased vitamin D intake such as with gastric bypass, small bowel disease, pancreatic disease, and dietary causes. Other causes include decreased skin synthesis of vitamin D such as decreased exposure to sunlight and skin disorders. Insufficient vitamin D synthesis such as defective 25-hydroxylation, 1-alpha hydroxylase, and 1-alpha 25-hydroxylation can also contribute to vitamin D deficiency.

Lack of vitamin D leads to reduced calcium absorption by the intestine leading to hypocalcemia and increased parathyroid hormone secretion. This increases bone resorption. In chronic kidney failure the problem is more specifically failure to convert vitamin D to its active form in the kidney. The bone disease in secondary hyperparathyroidism caused by kidney failure is termed renal osteodystrophy.

==== Tertiary ====
Tertiary hyperparathyroidism is seen in those with long-term secondary hyperparathyroidism, which eventually leads to hyperplasia of the parathyroid glands and a loss of response to serum calcium levels. This disorder is most often seen in patients with end-stage kidney disease and is an autonomous activity. Patients with late-stage kidney disease have an increased likelihood of developing tertiary hyperparathyroidism if not promptly corrected. In patients with late-stage kidney disease phosphate levels are elevated which directly affects the parathyroid glands and increases PTH production. Additionally, studies have shown that even in the absence of secondary hyperparathyroidism, those with X-Linked hypophosphatemia rickets who are on phosphate treatment are more susceptible to developing tertiary hyperparathyroidism.

== Treatment ==
Treatment depends on the type of hyperparathyroidism encountered.

=== Primary ===
Parathyroidectomy is a curative therapy for symptomatic hyperparathyroidism. Additionally, it decreases the risk of nephrolithiasis, osteoporosis, fragility fractures, and improves bone mineral density. Studies have also found that parathyroidectomy for hyperparathyroidism improves fatigue, weakness, depression, and memory. While parathyroidectomy is recommended for all patients with hyperparathyroidism who are symptomatic, indications of surgery for those who are asymptomatic include the following:

- Asymptomatic hyperparathyroidism with any of the following:
  - 24-hour urinary calcium >250 mg/day in women and >300 mg/day in men (see footnote, below)
  - serum calcium > 1 mg/dl above upper limit of normal
  - Creatinine clearance > 30% below normal for patient's age
  - Estimated glomerular filtration rate <60 mL/min/1.73 m2
  - Bone density > 2.5 standard deviations below peak (i.e., T-score of −2.5)
  - People age < 50
  - Nephrolithiasis seen on imaging (ultrasound or CT)

A 2020 Cochrane systematic review compared the surgical procedures of minimally invasive parathyroidectomy and classically used bilateral neck exploration, however it did not find one approach to be superior to the other in either benefits or risks.

Surgery can rarely result in hypoparathyroidism.

=== Secondary ===
In patients with secondary hyperparathyroidism, the high PTH levels are an appropriate response to low calcium and treatment must be directed at the underlying cause of this (usually vitamin D deficiency or chronic kidney failure). If this is successful, PTH levels return to normal levels, unless PTH secretion has become autonomous (tertiary hyperparathyroidism). Hyperphosphatemia may be treated by decreasing dietary intake of phosphate. If phosphate remains persistently elevated above 5.5 mg/dL with dietary restriction, then phosphate binders may be used. Vitamin D deficiency may be treated with vitamin D supplementation. However in patients with chronic kidney disease, patients should not receive vitamin D supplementation if they are elevated serum phosphate levels or have hypercalcemia.

=== Tertiary ===
Parathyroidectomy is indicated in tertiary hyperparathyroidism for patients who have severe osteopenia, severe persistent hypercalcemia (>11.0 mg/ dL), calciphylaxis, bone pain, or pathological fracture. A systematic review found surgical treatment to be superior regarding cure rates than medical therapy with cinacalcet with lower risk of complications.

=== Calcimimetics ===
A calcimimetic (such as cinacalcet) is a potential therapy for some people with severe hypercalcemia and primary hyperparathyroidism who are unable to undergo parathyroidectomy, and for secondary hyperparathyroidism on dialysis. Treatment of secondary hyperparathyroidism with a calcimimetic in those on dialysis for CKD does not alter the risk of early death; however, it does decrease the likelihood of needing a parathyroidectomy. Treatment carries the risk of low blood calcium levels and vomiting.

== Epidemiology ==
In the developed world, between one and four per thousand people are affected. Primary hyperparathyroidism is the most common type. Certain exposures increase the risk of developing primary hyperparathyroidism such as sex and age. It occurs three times more often in women than men and is often diagnosed between the ages of 50 and 60 but is not uncommon before then. The disease was first described in the 1700s. In the late 1800s, it was determined to be related to the parathyroid. Surgery as a treatment was first carried out in 1925. The United States prevalence of primary hyperparathyroidism from 2010 was 233 per 100,000 women and 85 per 100,000 men. Black and white women aged 70–79 have the highest overall prevalence. Secondary hyperparathyroidism is most commonly caused by chronic kidney disease and vitamin D deficiency. The prevalence of vitamin D deficiency is about 50% of the world population and chronic kidney disease prevalence is 15% of the United States population.

== History ==
The oldest known case was found in a cadaver from an Early Neolithic cemetery in southwest Germany.
