= Sestamibi parathyroid scan =

Procedure in nuclear medicine

Sestamibi parathyroid scintigraphy
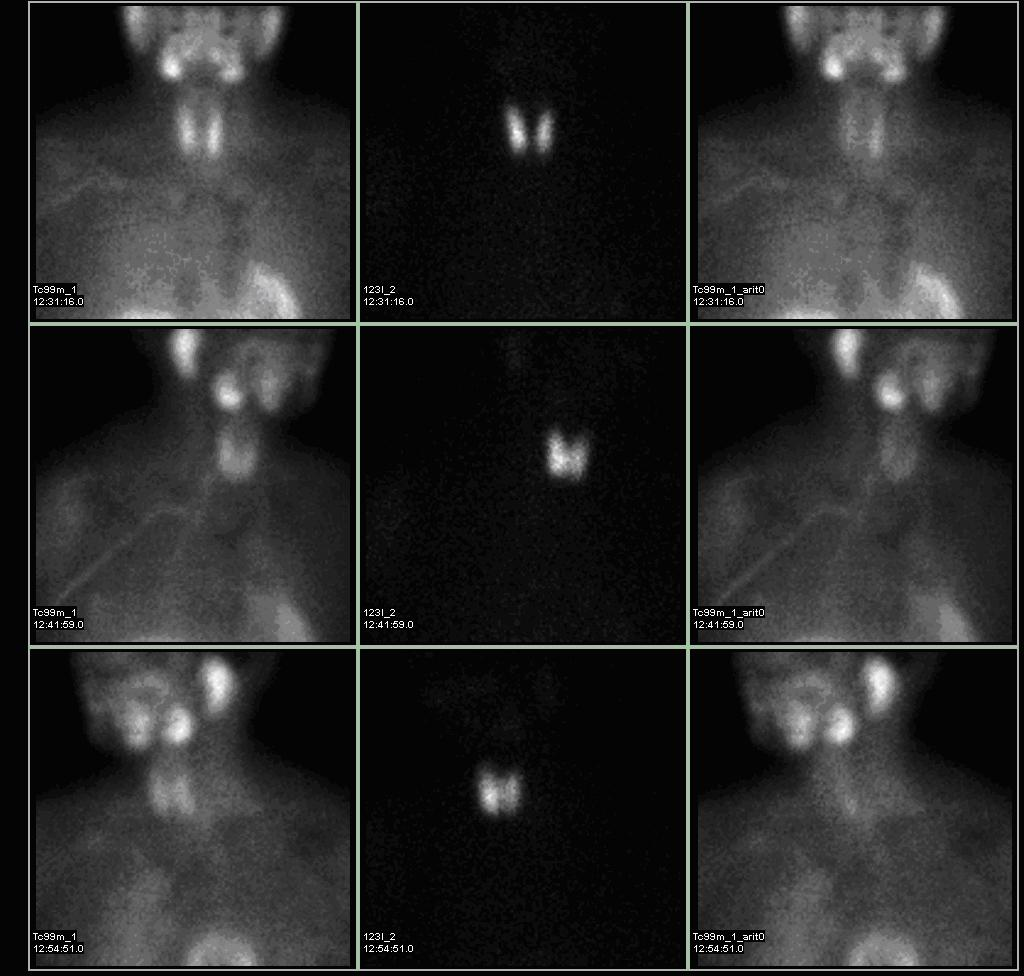
- A nuclear medicine parathyroid scan demonstrates a parathyroid adenoma adjacent to the left inferior pole of the thyroid gland. The above study was performed with Technetium-Sestamibi (1st column) and Iodine-123 (2nd column) simultaneous imaging and the subtraction technique (3rd column).
- ICD-10-PCS: CG11
- ICD-9-CM: 92.13
- OPS-301 code: 3-702

A sestamibi parathyroid scan is a procedure in nuclear medicine which is performed to localize parathyroid adenoma, which causes Hyperparathyroidism. Adequate localization of parathyroid adenoma allows the surgeon to use a minimally invasive surgical approach.

== Physiology and process ==
Tc99m-sestamibi is absorbed faster by a hyperfunctioning parathyroid gland than by a normal parathyroid gland. This is dependent on several histologic features within the abnormal parathyroid gland itself. Sestamibi imaging is correlated with the number and activity of the mitochondria within the parathyroid cells, such that oxyphil cell parathyroid adenomas have a very high avidity for sestamibi, while chief cell parathyroid adenomas have almost no imaging quality at all with sestamibi. Some researchers have also attempted to quantify or characterize the imaging capabilities of parathyroid glands by the MDR gene expression. Approximately 60 percent of parathyroid adenomas may be imaged by sestamibi scanning. The natural distribution of causation for primary hyperparathyroidism is roughly 85% solitary adenomas, 10-15% diffuse hyperplasia, and 1% cancer.

Imaging is not as reliable in patients with multiglandular parathyroid disease. In addition, size limitation of the abnormal gland can limit the detection by radionuclide scanning. SPECT (three-dimensional) imaging, as an adjunct to planar methods, may increase sensitivity and accuracy, especially in cases of small parathymic adenomas. By using a gamma camera in nuclear medicine, the radiologist is able to determine if one of the four parathyroid glands is hyperfunctioning, if that is the cause of the hyperparathyroidism. Theoretically, the hyperfunctioning parathyroid gland will take up more of the Tc99m-sestamibi, and will show up 'brighter' than the other normal parathyroid glands on the gamma camera pictures, especially because of the internal biofeedback loop within the body with calcium inherently feeding back to calcium-receptors and inhibiting parathyroid hormone production within the normal parathyroid glands. Sometimes this determination must be made three or four hours later when activity taken up by the thyroid and normal parathyroid glands fade away; the abnormal parathyroid gland retains its activity, while the radiopharmaceutical is eluted out of the normal thyroid gland. In patients with nodular goiter or functional tumors of the thyroid gland, increased uptake of the sestamibi agent is possible and makes parathyroid localization difficult or confusing.

Newer modalities using the same sestamibi tracer in more sophisticated scanners, such as SPECT/CT machines, have improved localization of parathyroid adenomas, especially in ectopic locations.

== Surgery ==
By knowing which of the four parathyroid glands is hyperfunctioning, a surgeon is able to remove only the one parathyroid gland that is producing excessive amounts of parathyroid hormone and no longer under the biochemical control of the body, and leave the other three normal parathyroid glands in place. This operation is now termed a "minimally invasive parathyroidectomy", sometimes using a radionuclear detection probe, and correlated with intra-operative parathyroid hormone level measurements. The remaining three glands are able to properly regulate serum calcium levels appropriately after the resolution of the hypercalcemia, as the calcium receptors lead to stimulation of parathyroid hormone secretion.
