= Parathyroid gland =

Endocrine gland

- Diagram showing structures in the human neck. The four green shaded areas represent the most common position of the parathyroid glands, which are generally four in number and situated behind the lateral lobes of the thyroid gland (shaded orange).

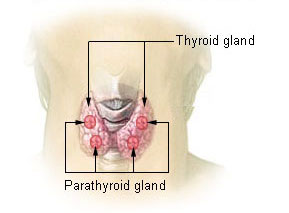
- Thyroid and parathyroids as viewed from the front of the neck

Details
- Precursor: Neural crest mesenchyme and third and fourth pharyngeal pouch endoderm
- System: Endocrine
- Artery: Superior thyroid artery, inferior thyroid artery,
- Vein: Superior thyroid vein, middle thyroid vein, inferior thyroid vein,
- Nerve: Middle cervical ganglion, inferior cervical ganglion
- Lymph: Pretracheal, prelaryngeal, jugulodigastric lymph nodes

Identifiers
- Latin: glandula parathyreoidea inferior, glandula parathyreoidea superior
- MeSH: D010280
- TA98: A11.4.00.001
- TA2: 3870
- FMA: 13890

Parathyroid glands are small endocrine glands in the neck of humans and other tetrapods. Humans usually have four parathyroid glands, located on the back of the thyroid gland in variable locations. The parathyroid gland produces and secretes parathyroid hormone in response to low blood calcium, which plays a key role in regulating the amount of calcium in the blood and within the bones.

Parathyroid glands share a similar blood supply, venous drainage, and lymphatic drainage to the thyroid glands. Parathyroid glands are derived from the epithelial lining of the third and fourth pharyngeal pouches, with the superior glands arising from the fourth pouch and the inferior glands arising from the higher third pouch. The relative position of the inferior and superior glands, which are named according to their final location, changes because of the migration of embryological tissues.

Hyperparathyroidism and hypoparathyroidism, characterized by alterations in the blood calcium levels and bone metabolism, are states of either surplus or deficient parathyroid function.

== Structure ==
The parathyroid glands are two pairs of glands usually positioned behind the left and right lobes of the thyroid. Each gland is a yellowish-brown flat ovoid that resembles a lentil seed, usually about 6 mm long and 3 to 4 mm wide, and 1 to 2 mm anteroposteriorly. There are typically four parathyroid glands. The two parathyroid glands on each side which are positioned higher are called the superior parathyroid glands, while the lower two are called the inferior parathyroid glands. Healthy parathyroid glands generally weigh about 30 mg in men and 35 mg in women. These glands are not visible or able to be felt during examination of the neck.

Each parathyroid vein drains into the superior, middle and inferior thyroid veins. The superior and middle thyroid veins drain into the internal jugular vein, and the inferior thyroid vein drains into the brachiocephalic vein.

=== Lymphatic drainage ===
Lymphatic vessels from the parathyroid glands drain into deep cervical lymph nodes and paratracheal lymph nodes.

=== Variation ===
The parathyroid glands are variable in number: three or more small glands, and can usually be located on the posterior surface of the thyroid gland. Occasionally, some individuals may have six, eight, or even more parathyroid glands. Rarely, the parathyroid glands may be within the thyroid gland itself, the chest, or even the thymus.

=== Microanatomy ===
The parathyroid glands are named for their proximity to the thyroid—and serve a completely different role than the thyroid gland. The parathyroid glands are quite easily recognizable from the thyroid as they have densely packed cells, in contrast with the follicular structure of the thyroid. Two unique types of cells are present in the parathyroid gland:

- Chief cells, which synthesize and release parathyroid hormone. These cells are small, and appear dark when loaded with parathyroid hormone, and clear when the hormone has been secreted, or in their resting state.
- Oxyphil cells, which are lighter in appearance and increase in number with age, have an unknown function.
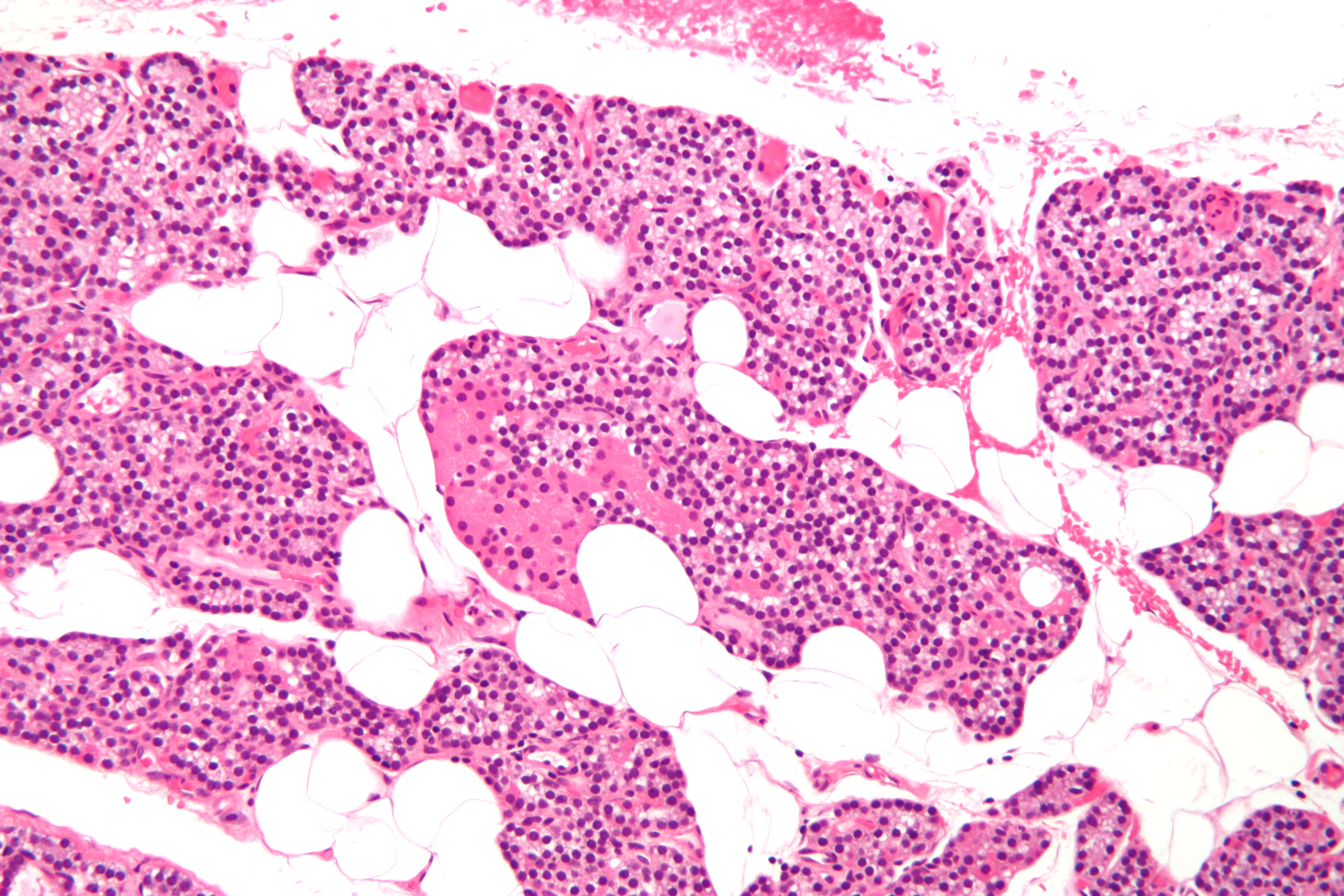
Intermediate magnification micrograph. H&E stain. The white round structures are fat cells. Adipose tissue comprises 25–40% of normal parathyroid gland tissue.

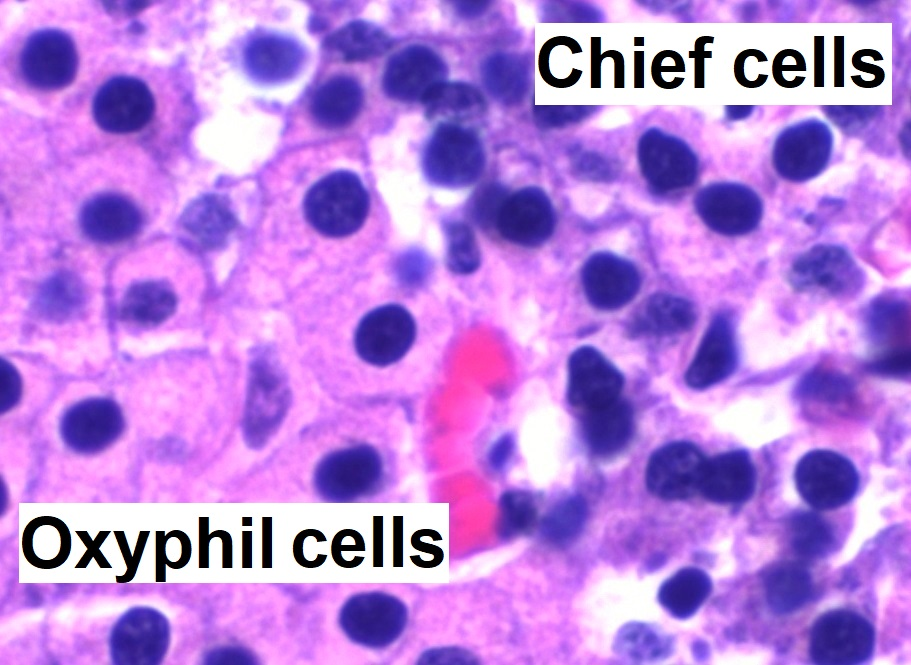
High magnification micrograph. H&E stain. The small, dark cells are chief cells, which are responsible for secreting parathyroid hormone. The cells with orange/pink staining cytoplasm are oxyphil cells

=== Development ===
In the early development of the human embryo, a series of five pharyngeal arches and four pharyngeal pouches form that give rise to the face, neck, and surrounding structures. The pouches are numbered such that the first pouch is the closest to the top of the embryo's head and the fourth is the farthest from it. The parathyroid glands originate from the interaction of the endoderm of the third and fourth pouch and neural crest mesenchyme. The position of the glands reverses during embryological development. The pair of glands which is ultimately inferior develops from the third pouch with the thymus, whereas the pair of glands which is ultimately superior develops from the fourth pouch. During embryological development, the thymus migrates downward, dragging the inferior glands with it. The superior pair are not dragged downward by the fourth pouch to the same degree. The glands are named after their final, not embryological, positions. Since the thymus's ultimate destination is in the mediastinum of the chest, it is occasionally possible to have ectopic parathyroids derived from the third pouch within the chest cavity if they fail to detach in the neck.

Parathyroid development is regulated by a number of genes, including those coding for several transcription factors. (Note: Namely the co-activator EYA1, the homeobox transcription factor SIX1, and the transcription factor GCM2)

== Function ==
The major function of the parathyroid glands is to maintain the body's calcium and phosphate levels within a very narrow range, so that the nervous and muscular systems can function properly. The parathyroid glands do this by secreting parathyroid hormone (PTH).

Parathyroid hormone (also known as parathormone) is a small protein that takes part in the control of calcium and phosphate homeostasis, as well as bone physiology. Parathyroid hormone has effects antagonistic to those of calcitonin.

- Calcium. PTH increases blood calcium levels by directly stimulating osteoblasts and thereby indirectly stimulating osteoclasts (through RANK/RANKL mechanism) to break down bone and release calcium. PTH increases gastrointestinal calcium absorption by activating vitamin D, and promotes calcium conservation (reabsorption) by the kidneys.
- Phosphate. PTH is the major regulator of serum phosphate concentrations via actions on the kidney. It is an inhibitor of proximal tubular reabsorption of phosphorus. Through activation of vitamin D intestinal absorption of phosphate is increased.

== Disorders ==
Parathyroid disease is conventionally divided into states where the parathyroid is overactive (hyperparathyroidism), and states where the parathyroid is under- or hypoactive (hypoparathyroidism). Both states are characterised by their symptoms, which relate to the excess or deficiency of parathyroid hormone in the blood.

=== Hyperparathyroidism ===
==== Primary ====
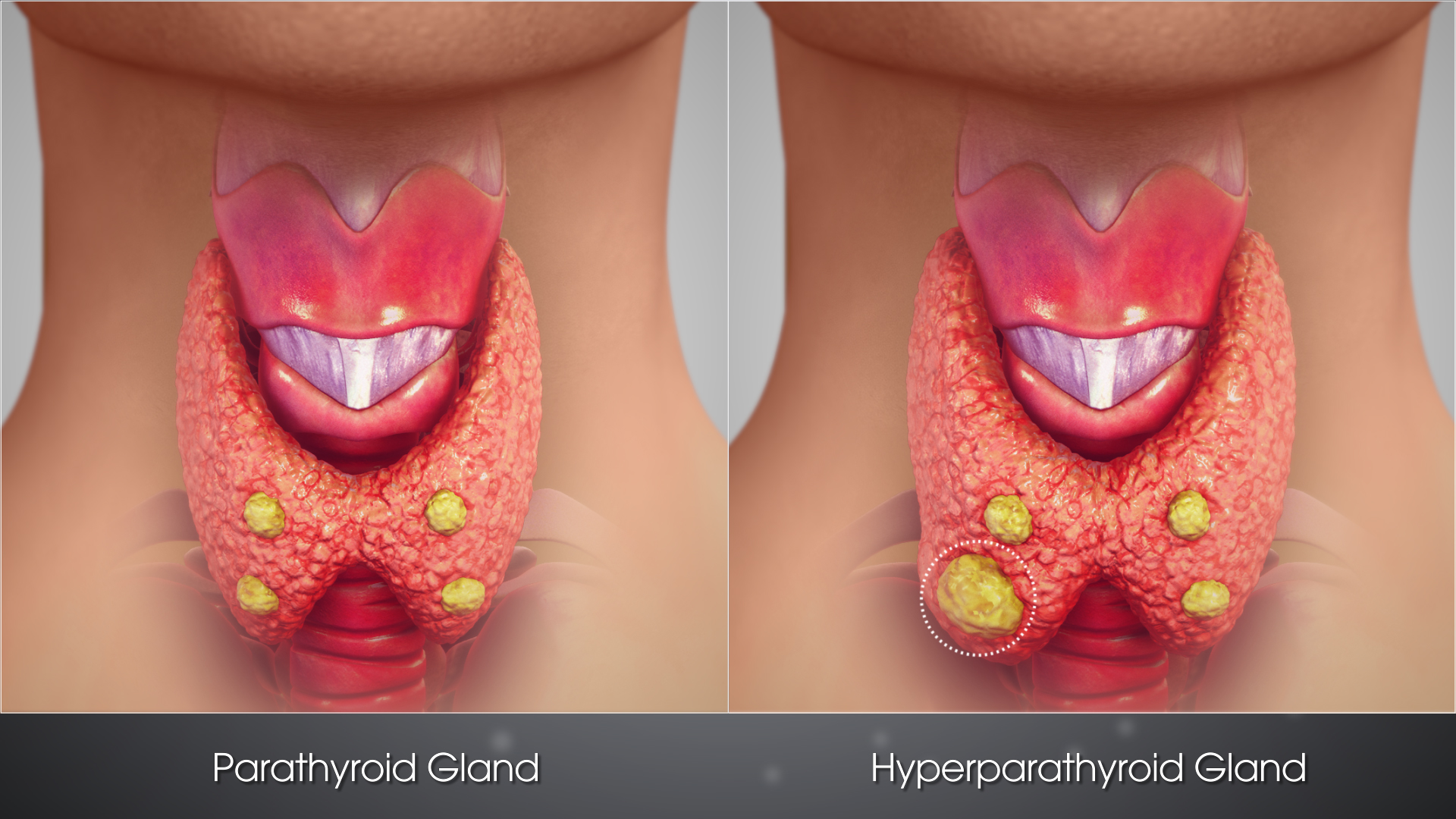
3D medical animation image showing hyperparathyroidism (right)

Hyperparathyroidism is the state in which there is excess parathyroid hormone circulating in the blood. This may cause bone pain and tenderness, due to increased bone resorption. With increased circulating calcium, there may be other symptoms associated with hypercalcemia, most commonly dehydration. Hyperparathyroidism is most commonly caused by a benign proliferation of chief cells in one parathyroid gland, and rarely in MEN syndrome. This is known as primary hyperparathyroidism, which is generally managed by surgical removal of the abnormal parathyroid gland.

==== Secondary ====
Renal disease may lead to hyperparathyroidism. When too much calcium is lost from the blood via urination, there is a compensation by the parathyroid, and parathyroid hormone is released. The glands enlarge (hypertrophy) to synthesize more parathyroid hormone. This is known as secondary hyperparathyroidism.

==== Tertiary ====
If secondary hyperparathyroidism persists over months, the parathyroid tissue may become unresponsive to the blood calcium levels, and begin to autonomously release parathyroid hormone. This is known as tertiary hyperparathyroidism.

=== Hypoparathyroidism ===
The state of decreased parathyroid activity is known as hypoparathyroidism. This is most commonly associated with damage to the glands or their blood supply during thyroid surgery – it may be associated with rarer genetic syndromes such as DiGeorge syndrome, which is inherited as an autosomal dominant syndrome. Hypoparathyroidism will occur after surgical removal of the parathyroid glands.

Occasionally, an individual's tissues are resistant to the effects of parathyroid hormone. This is known as pseudohypoparathyroidism. In this case, the parathyroid glands are fully functional. However, the hormone itself is not able to function, resulting in a decrease in blood calcium levels. Pseudohypoparathyroidism is often associated with the genetic condition Albright's hereditary osteodystrophy. Pseudo-pseudohypoparathyroidism, one of the longest words in the English language, is used to describe an individual with Albright's hereditary osteodystrophy with normal parathyroid hormone and serum calcium levels.

Hypoparathyroidism may present with symptoms associated with decreased calcium, and is generally treated with Vitamin D analogues.

== History ==
The parathyroid glands were first discovered in the Indian rhinoceros by Richard Owen in 1852. In his description of the neck anatomy, Owen referred to the glands as "a small compact yellow glandular body attached to the thyroid at the point where the veins emerged". The glands were first discovered in humans by Ivar Viktor Sandström (1852–1889), a Swedish medical student, in 1880 at Uppsala University. Unaware of Owen's description, he described the glands in his monograph "On a New Gland in Man and Fellow Animals" as the "glandulae parathyroidae", noting its existence in dogs, cats, rabbits, oxen, horses and humans. For several years, Sandström's description received little attention.

Eugene Gley, Giulio Vassale, and others documented the putative function of the glands in 1891, noting the connection between their removal and the development of muscular tetany. William G. MacCallum in 1908, investigating tumours of the parathyroid, proposed their role in calcium metabolism. He noted that "Tetany occurs spontaneously in many forms and may be produced by the destruction of the parathyroid glands".

The first successful removal of the parathyroid may have been carried out in 1928 by medical doctor Isaac Y Olch, whose intern had noticed elevated calcium levels in an elderly patient with muscle weakness. Prior to this surgery, patients with removed parathyroid glands typically died from muscular tetany.

Parathyroid hormone was isolated in 1923 by Adolph M. Hanson and 1925 by James B. Collip. Studies of parathyroid hormone levels by Roger Guillemin, Andrew Schally and Rosalyn Sussman Yalow led to the development of immunoassays capable of measuring body substances and a Nobel Prize in 1977.

== Other animals ==
Parathyroid glands are found in all adult tetrapods; they vary in their number and position. Mammals typically have four parathyroid glands, while other types of animals typically have six. The removal of parathyroid glands in animals produces a condition resembling acute poisoning with irregular muscle contractions.

Fish do not possess parathyroid glands; several species have been found to express parathyroid hormone. Developmental genes and calcium-sensing receptors in fish gills are similar to those within the parathyroid glands of birds and mammals. It has been suggested that the tetrapod glands may have been evolutionarily derived from these fish gills.

== Additional images ==
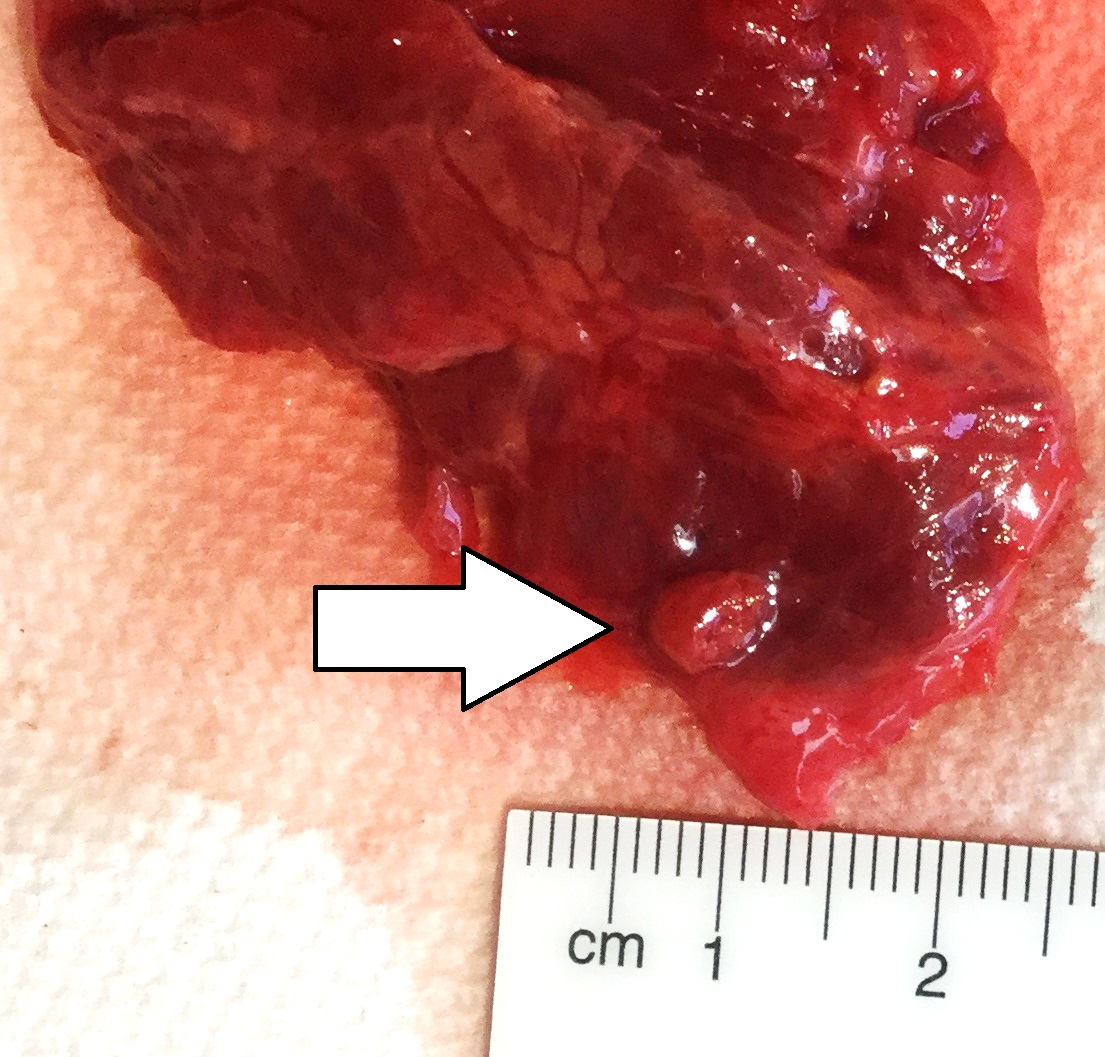
Gross pathology of a parathyroid gland (white arrow), next to the thyroid gland

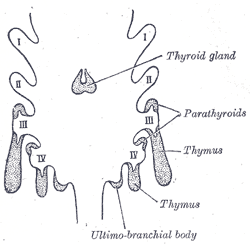
Scheme showing development of branchial epithelial bodies. I, II, III, IV. Branchial pouches.

== See also ==
- Thyroid
