= Calcium acetate/magnesium carbonate =

Combination drug

Combination of
- Calcium acetate: Mineral supplement
- Magnesium carbonate: Mineral supplement

Clinical data
- Trade names: OsvaRen, Renepho
- AHFS/Drugs.com: UK Drug Information
- Pregnancy category: Not tested
- Routes of administration: Oral
- ATC code: V03AE04 (WHO)

Legal status
- Legal status: In general: ℞ (Prescription only)

Identifiers
- CAS Number: 1173882-48-8

Calcium acetate/magnesium carbonate is a fixed-dose combination drug that contains 110 mg calcium and 60 mg magnesium ions and is indicated as a phosphate binder for dialysis patients with hyperphosphataemia (abnormal high serum phosphorus levels). It is registered by Fresenius Medical Care under the trade names Renepho (Belgium) and OsvaRen (a number of other European countries).

== Clinical use ==
Phosphorus is contained in food with high protein content as well as in processed food. It is absorbed by the small intestine. Healthy kidneys remove excess phosphorus from the body. One of the consequences of renal failure is inadequate removal of phosphorus resulting in increased serum phosphorus levels. This may worsen the overproduction of parathyroid hormone (hyperparathyroidism), and may lead to renal osteodystrophy, calcification of blood vessels and is associated with cardiovascular mortality (the so-called chronic kidney disease-mineral and bone disorder, CKD-MBD). In addition to dialysis therapy and dietary restrictions, a pharmaceutical therapy to lower serum phosphorus levels is recommended.

== Mechanism of action ==
Calcium acetate/magnesium carbonate is taken orally together with the meal. Calcium acetate and magnesium carbonate compounds bind phosphorus derived from food thereby forming indigestible phosphate salts in the intestine that are subsequently excreted with the faeces. The aim of the therapy is to reach a normal serum phosphorus level, i.e. between 0.81 and 1.45 mmol/L (2.5–4.5 mg/dL).

== Side effects ==
Side effects from pharmaceutical therapy such as gastrointestinal disorders, e.g. nausea, constipation or diarrhoea may occur, as well as metabolism and nutritional disorders, e.g. hypercalcaemia or hypermagnesaemia.

== See also ==
- Chronic kidney disease
- Chronic kidney disease–mineral and bone disorder
- Renal osteodystrophy
