= C26H42O4 =

The molecular formula C_{26}H_{42}O_{4} may refer to:

- Diisononyl phthalate
- Maxacalcitol
