= Eutrophication =

Accumulation of nutrients in water

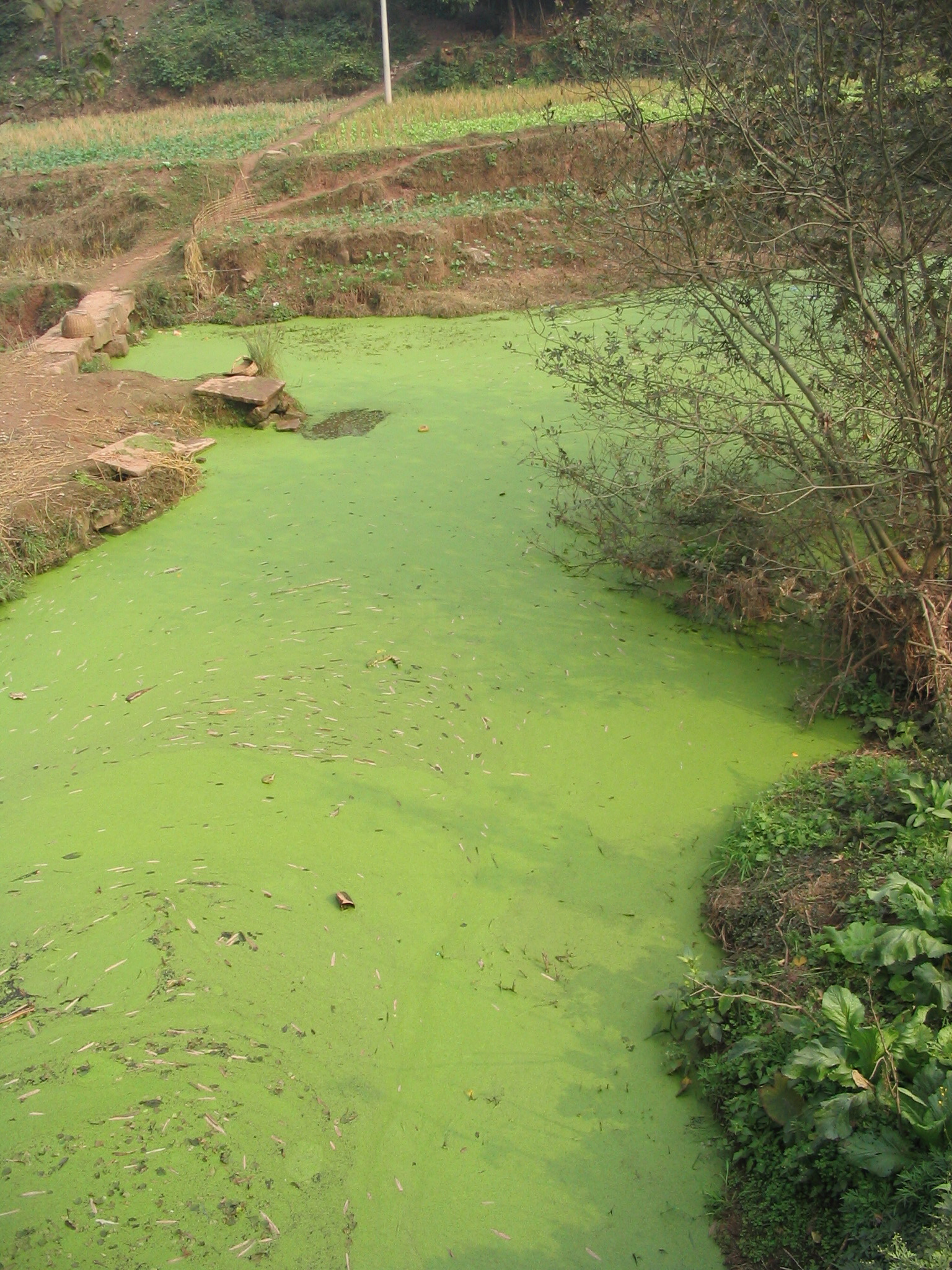
Eutrophication can cause harmful blooms like this duckweed bloom in a river near Chengdu, China.

Eutrophication is a general term describing a process in which nutrients accumulate in a body of water, resulting in an increased growth of organisms that may deplete the oxygen in the water; i.e. the process of too many plants growing on the surface of a river, lake, etc., often because chemicals that are used to help crops grow have been carried there by rain. Eutrophication may occur naturally or as a result of human actions. Manmade, or cultural, eutrophication occurs when sewage, industrial wastewater, fertilizer runoff, and other nutrient sources are released into the environment. Such nutrient pollution usually causes algal blooms and bacterial growth, resulting in the depletion of dissolved oxygen in water and causing substantial environmental degradation. Many policies have been introduced to combat eutrophication, including the United Nations Development Program (UNDP)'s sustainability development goals.

Approaches for prevention and reversal of eutrophication include minimizing point source pollution from sewage and agriculture as well as other nonpoint pollution sources. Additionally, the introduction of bacteria and algae-inhibiting organisms such as shellfish and seaweed can also help reduce nitrogen pollution, which in turn controls the growth of cyanobacteria, the main source of harmful algae blooms.

== History and terminology ==
The term "eutrophication" comes from the Greek eutrophos, meaning "well-nourished",. Waterways that receive excessive amounts of nutrients often experience large blooms of algae. This overgrowth ultimately makes the water brackish as the organisms that once thrived in it, now die in what is basically a mass extinction of all life within that area leaving behind it "dead zones" i.e. non-oxygenated water. As these pockets grow, they destroy more and more life until eventually they reach an area that has enough oxygen to deter their advance.

Water bodies with very low nutrient levels are termed oligotrophic and those with moderate nutrient levels are termed mesotrophic. Advanced eutrophication may also be referred to as dystrophic and hypertrophic conditions. Thus, eutrophication has been defined as "degradation of water quality owing to enrichment by nutrients which results in excessive plant (principally algae) growth and decay."

Eutrophication was recognized as a water pollution problem in European and North American lakes and reservoirs in the mid-20th century. Breakthrough research carried out at the Experimental Lakes Area (ELA) in Ontario, Canada, in the 1970s provided the evidence that freshwater bodies are phosphorus-limited. ELA uses the whole ecosystem approach and long-term, whole-lake investigations of freshwater focusing on cultural eutrophication.

In 1973, researchers split Lake 226 at the Experimental Lakes Area into two basins using an impermeable curtain. They added nitrogen and carbon to both basins, but phosphorus to only one. Only the basin receiving phosphorus developed a large algal bloom, evidence of phosphorus's part in lake eutrophication.

== Causes ==
Sodium triphosphate, once a component of many detergents, was a major contributor to eutrophication.

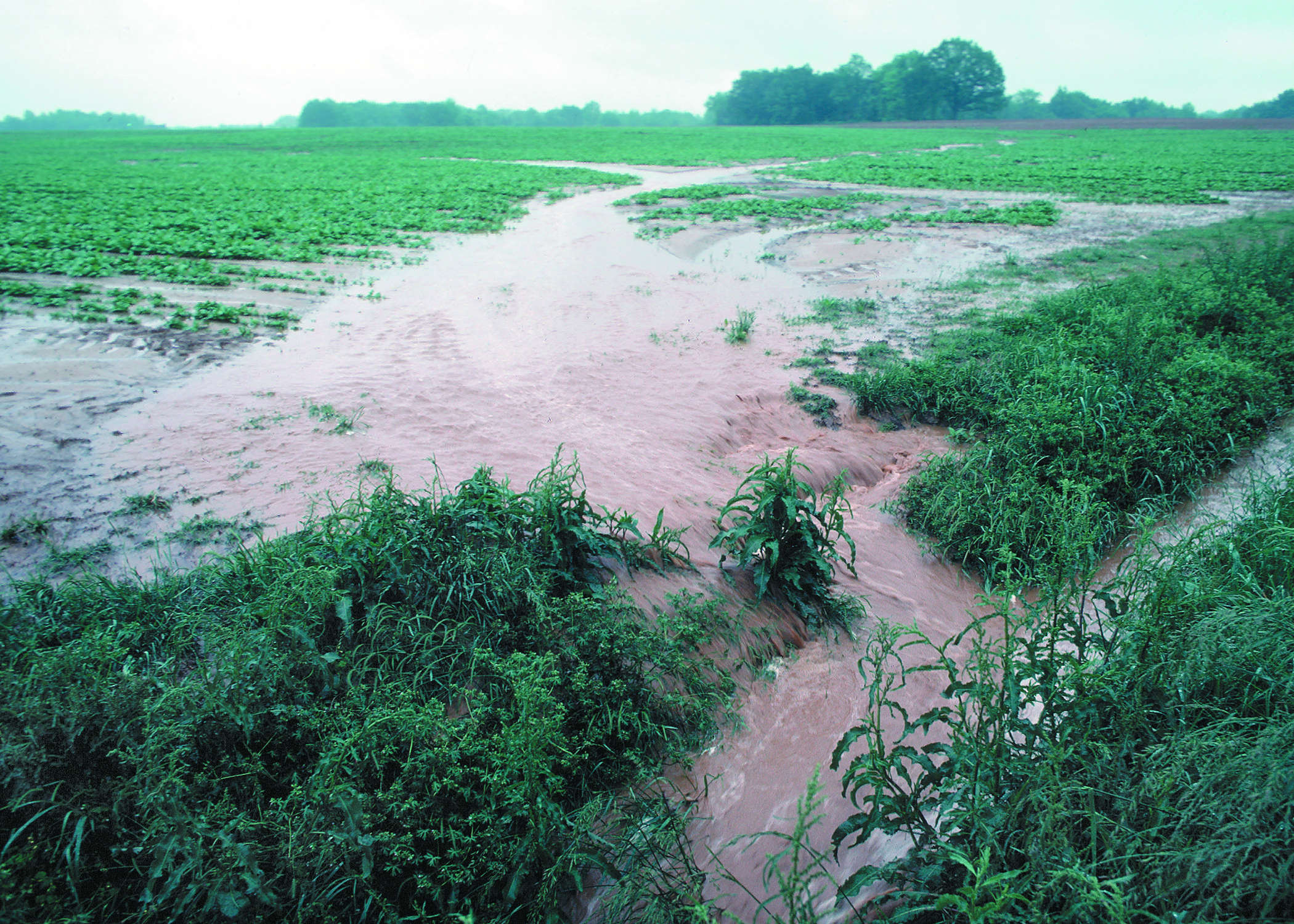
An example in Tennessee of how soil from fertilized fields can turn into runoff after a storm, creating a flux of nutrients that flow into local bodies of water such as lakes and creeks

Eutrophication is caused by excessive concentrations of nutrients, most commonly phosphates and nitrates, although this varies with location. Prior to their being phasing out in the 1970's, phosphate-containing detergents contributed to eutrophication. Since then, sewage and agriculture have emerged as the dominant phosphate sources. The main sources of nitrogen pollution are from agricultural runoff containing fertilizers and animal wastes, from sewage, and from atmospheric deposition of nitrogen originating from combustion or animal waste.

The limitation of productivity in any aquatic system varies with the rate of supply (from external sources) and removal (flushing out) of nutrients from the body of water. This means that some nutrients are more prevalent in certain areas than others and different ecosystems and environments have different limiting factors.

Phosphorus is the limiting factor for plant growth in most freshwater ecosystems, and because phosphate adheres tightly to soil particles and sinks in areas such as wetlands and lakes, due to its prevalence nowadays more and more phosphorus is accumulating inside freshwater bodies.

In marine ecosystems, nitrogen is the primary limiting nutrient; nitrous oxide (created by the combustion of fossil fuels) and its deposition in the water from the atmosphere has led to an increase in nitrogen levels, and also the heightened levels of eutrophication in the ocean.

=== Cultural eutrophication ===
Cultural or anthropogenic eutrophication is the process that causes eutrophication because of human activity. The problem became more apparent following the introduction of chemical fertilizers in agriculture (green revolution of the mid-1900s).

Phosphorus and nitrogen are the two main nutrients that cause cultural eutrophication as they enrich the water, allowing for some aquatic plants, especially algae to grow rapidly and bloom in high densities. Algal blooms can shade out benthic plants thereby altering the overall plant community. When algae die off, their degradation by bacteria removes oxygen, potentially, generating anoxic conditions.

This anoxic environment kills off aerobic organisms (e.g. fish and invertebrates) in the water body. This also affects terrestrial animals, restricting their access to affected water (e.g. as drinking sources). Selection for algal and aquatic plant species that can thrive in nutrient-rich conditions can cause structural and functional disruption to entire aquatic ecosystems and their food webs, resulting in loss of habitat and species biodiversity.

There are several sources of excessive nutrients from human activity including run-off from fertilized fields, lawns, and golf courses, untreated sewage and wastewater and internal combustion of fuels creating nitrogen pollution. Cultural eutrophication can occur in fresh water and salt water bodies, shallow waters being the most susceptible. In shore lines and shallow lakes, sediments are frequently resuspended by wind and waves which can result in nutrient release from sediments into the overlying water, enhancing eutrophication. The deterioration of water quality caused by cultural eutrophication can therefore negatively impact human uses including potable supply for consumption, industrial uses and recreation.

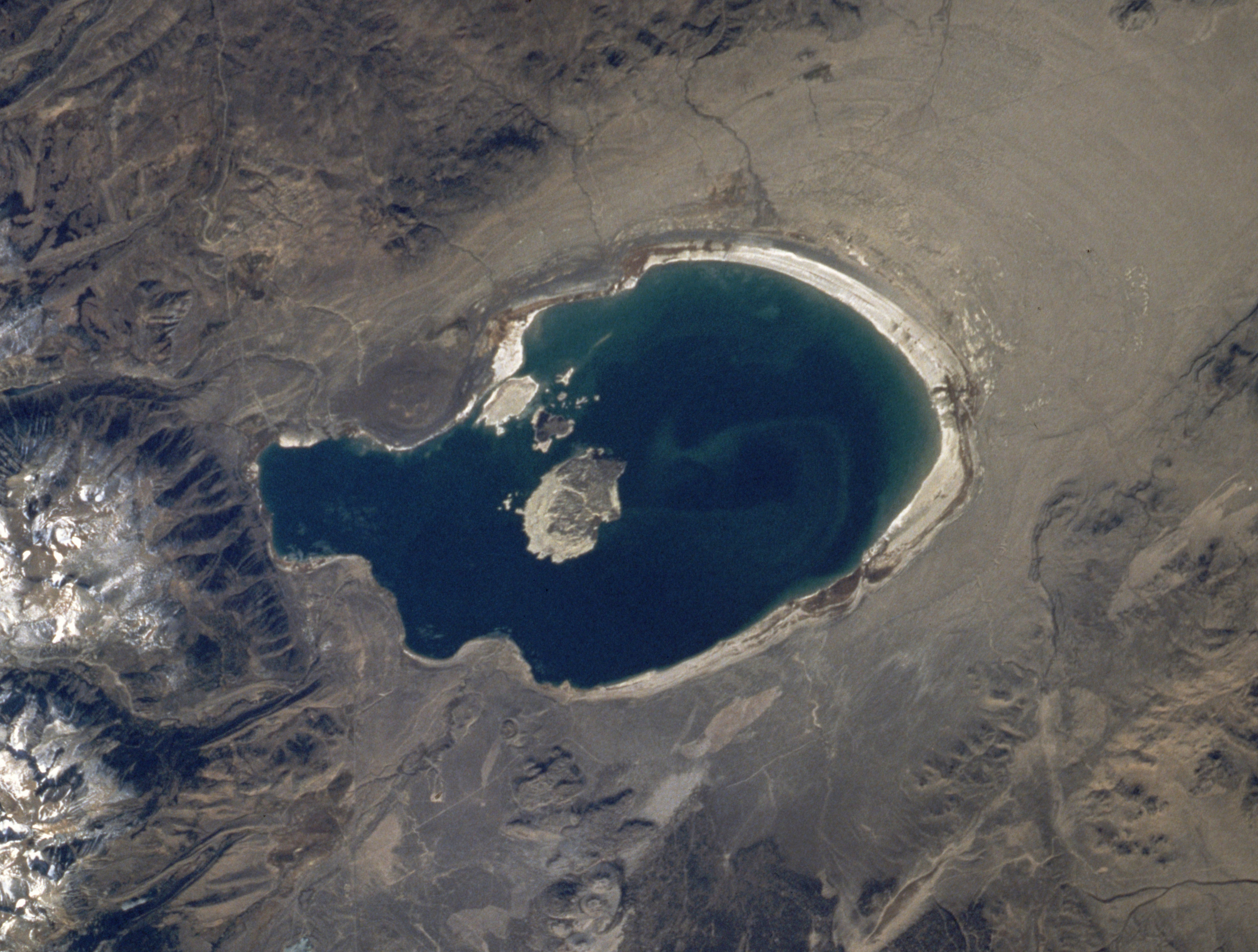
The eutrophication of Mono Lake, which is a cyanobacteria-rich soda lake

=== Natural eutrophication ===
Eutrophication can be a natural process and occurs naturally through the gradual accumulation of sediment and nutrients. Naturally, eutrophication is usually caused by the natural accumulation of nutrients from dissolved phosphate minerals and dead plant matter in water.

Natural eutrophication has been well-characterized in lakes. Paleolimnologists now recognise that climate change, geology, and other external influences are also critical in regulating the natural productivity of lakes.

A few artificial lakes also demonstrate the reverse process (meiotrophication), becoming less nutrient rich with time as nutrient poor inputs slowly elute the nutrient richer water mass of the lake. This process may be seen in artificial lakes and reservoirs which tend to be highly eutrophic on first filling but may become more oligotrophic with time. The main difference between natural and anthropogenic eutrophication is that the natural process is very slow, occurring on geological time scales.

== Effects ==
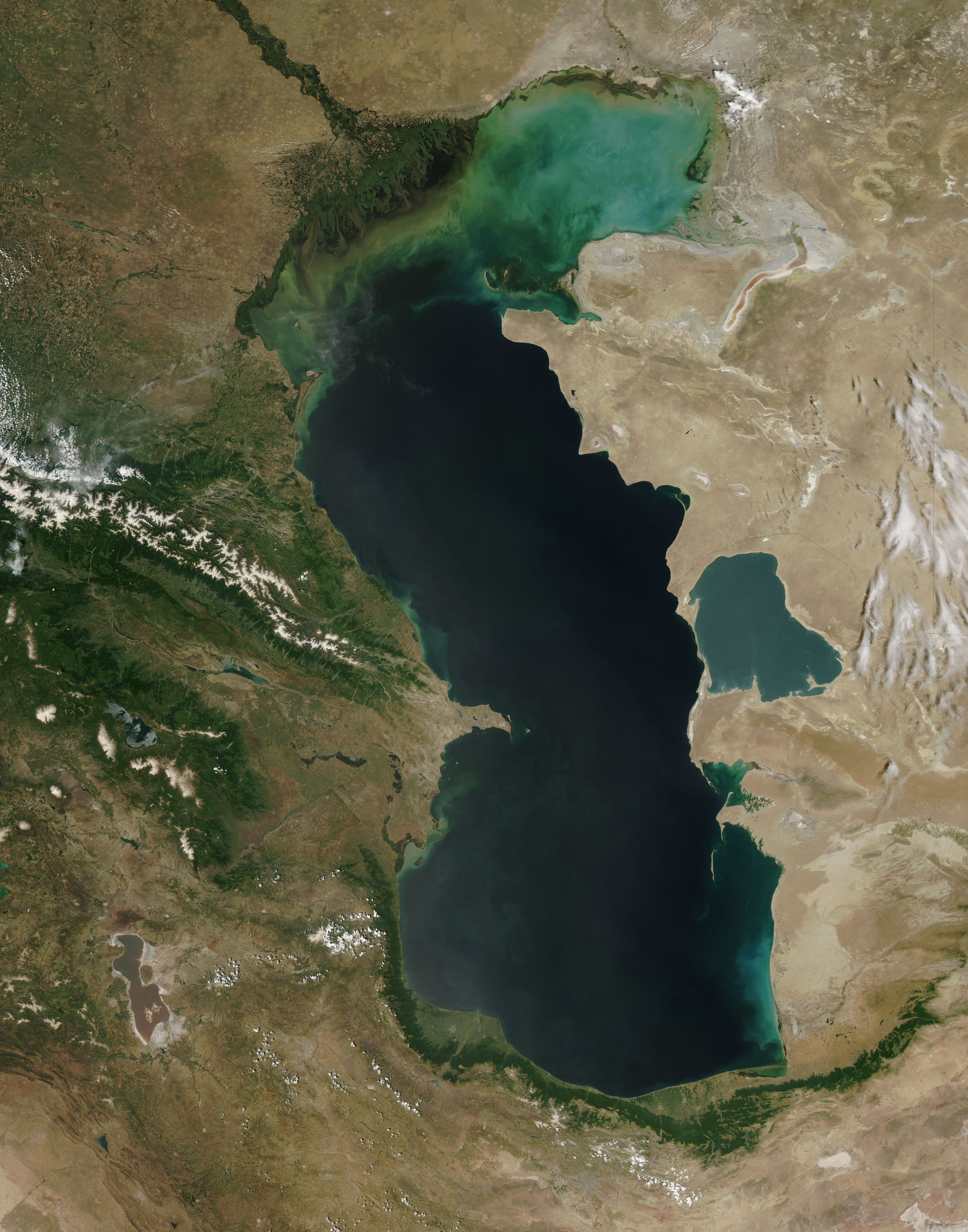
Eutrophication is apparent as increased turbidity in the northern part of the Caspian Sea, imaged from orbit.

=== Ecological effects ===
Eutrophication can have the following ecological effects: increased biomass of phytoplankton, changes in macrophyte species composition and biomass, dissolved oxygen depletion, increased incidences of fish kills, loss of desirable fish species.

==== Decreased biodiversity ====
When an ecosystem experiences an increase in nutrients, primary producers reap the benefits first. In aquatic ecosystems, species such as algae experience a population increase (called an algal bloom).

Algal blooms limit the sunlight available to bottom-dwelling organisms and cause wide swings in the amount of dissolved oxygen in the water. Oxygen is required by all aerobically respiring plants and animals and it is replenished in daylight by photosynthesizing plants and algae.

Under eutrophic conditions, dissolved oxygen greatly increases during the day, but is greatly reduced after dark by the respiring algae and by microorganisms that feed on the increasing mass of dead algae. When dissolved oxygen levels decline to hypoxic levels, fish and other marine animals suffocate. As a result, creatures such as fish, shrimp, and especially immobile bottom dwellers die off. In extreme cases, anaerobic conditions ensue, promoting growth of bacteria. Zones where this occurs are known as dead zones.

==== New species invasion ====
Eutrophication may cause competitive release by making abundant a normally limiting nutrient. This process causes shifts in the species composition of ecosystems. For instance, an increase in nitrogen might allow new, competitive species to invade and out-compete original inhabitant species. This has been shown to occur in New England salt marshes. In Europe and Asia, the common carp frequently lives in naturally eutrophic or hypereutrophic areas, and is adapted to living in such conditions. The eutrophication of areas outside its natural range partially explain the fish's success in colonizing these areas after being introduced.

==== Toxicity ====
Some harmful algal blooms resulting from eutrophication, are toxic to plants and animals. Freshwater algal blooms can pose a threat to livestock. When the algae die or are eaten, neuro- and hepatotoxins are released which can kill animals and may pose a threat to humans. An example of algal toxins working their way into humans is the case of shellfish poisoning. Biotoxins created during algal blooms are taken up by shellfish (mussels, oysters), leading to these human foods acquiring the toxicity and poisoning humans. Examples include paralytic, neurotoxic, and diarrhoetic shellfish poisoning. Other marine animals can be vectors for such toxins, as in the case of ciguatera, where it is typically a predator fish that accumulates the toxin and then poisons humans.

There are five types of toxins associated with harmful algal blooms (HABs). They include domoic acid, ciguatoxin, okadaic acid, brevetoxins, and saxitoxins. All of these toxins, with the exception of ciguatoxin, can cause different types of shellfish poisoning. Domoic acid is associated with amnesic shellfish poisoning; okadaic acid is associated with diarrhetic shellfish poisoning; brevetoxins are associated with neurotoxic shellfish poisoning; and saxitoxins are associated with paralytic shellfish poisoning. Different species of algae are associated with the different toxins. For example, Alexandrium, Pyrodinium, and Gymnodinium species generate saxitoxins. Saxitoxin is known to be 50 times more lethal than strychnine and 10,000 times more lethal than cyanide.

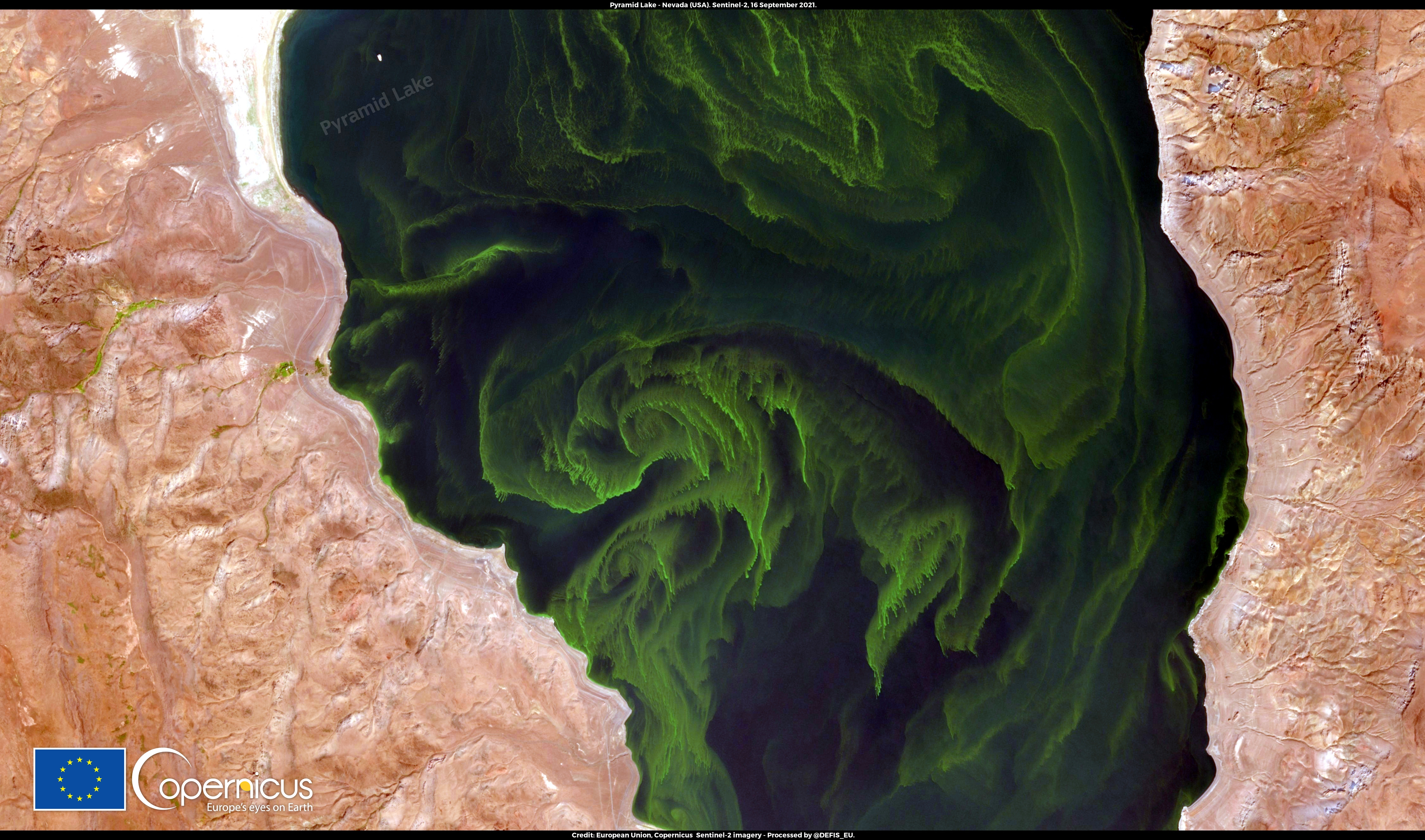
Pyramid Lake Algal Bloom

=== Economic effects ===
Eutrophication and harmful algal blooms can have economic impacts due to increasing water treatment costs, commercial fishing and shellfish losses, recreational fishing losses (reductions in harvestable fish and shellfish), and reduced tourism income (decreases in perceived aesthetic value of the water body and decreases in safety due to high bacteria levels from decomposition). Water treatment costs can be increased due to decreases in water transparency (increased turbidity). There can also be issues with color and smell during drinking water treatment. However, controlled eutrophication can potentially be used to increase production in fisheries, which in turn increases community income. Notably, there is a delicate line where eutrophication can become damaging very quickly, and as such is not recommended currently due to high eutrophication rates.

=== Health impacts ===
Human health effects of eutrophication derive from two main issues excess nitrate in drinking water and exposure to toxic algae. Nitrates in drinking water can cause Blue baby syndrome in infants and can react with chemicals used to treat water to create disinfection by-products in drinking water. Getting direct contact with toxic algae through swimming or drinking can cause rashes, stomach or liver illness, and respiratory or neurological problems.

== Causes and effects for different types of water bodies ==
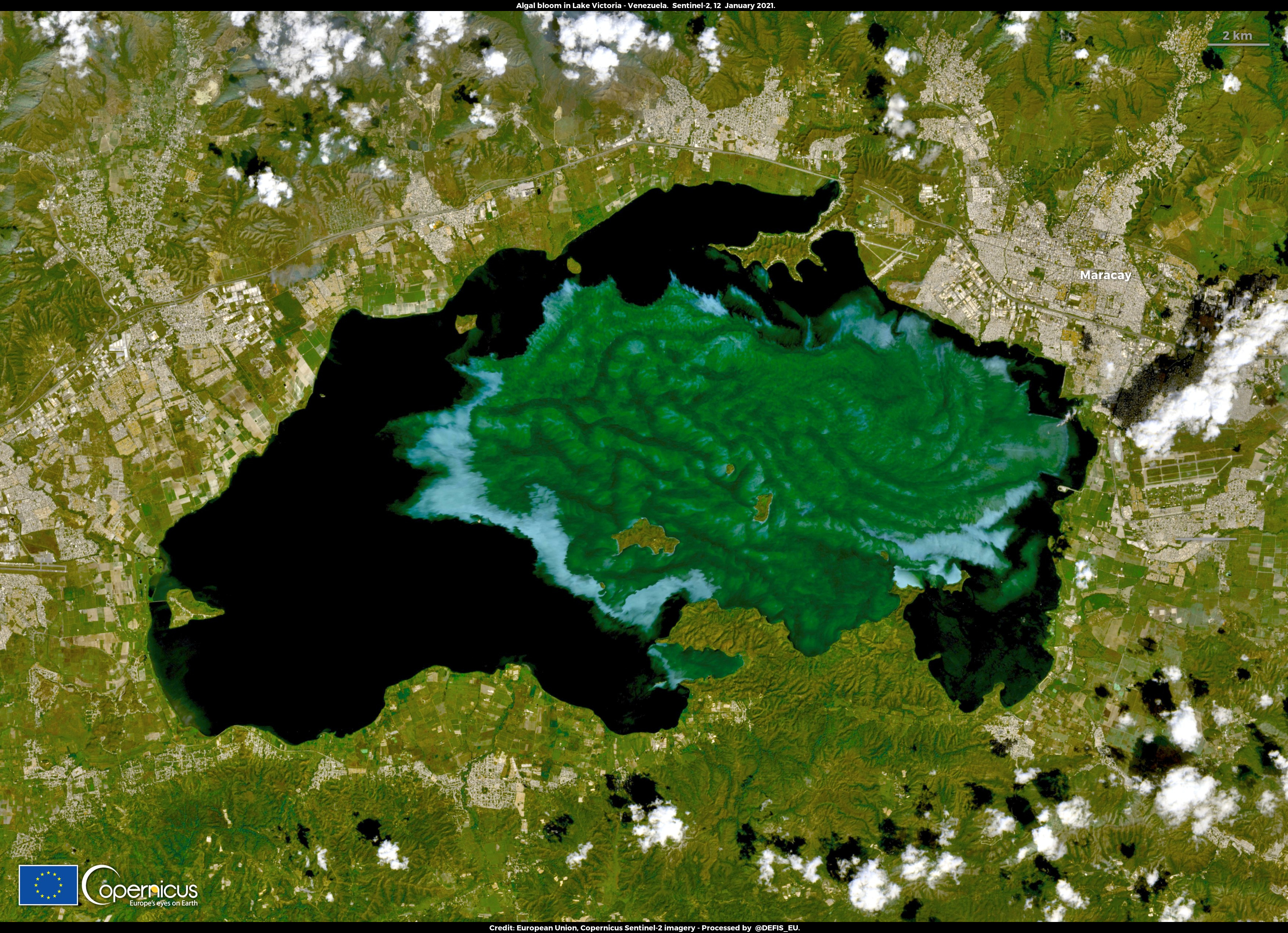
An algal bloom in Lake Valencia, the largest freshwater lake in Venezuela. Since 1976 the lake has been affected by eutrophication caused by wastewater.

=== Freshwater systems ===
One response to added amounts of nutrients in aquatic ecosystems is the rapid growth of microscopic algae, creating an algal bloom. In freshwater ecosystems, the formation of floating algal blooms are commonly nitrogen-fixing cyanobacteria (blue-green algae). This outcome is favored when soluble nitrogen becomes limiting and phosphorus inputs remain significant. Nutrient pollution is a major cause of algal blooms and excess growth of other aquatic plants leading to overcrowding competition for sunlight, space, and oxygen. Increased competition for the added nutrients can cause potential disruption to entire ecosystems and food webs, as well as a loss of habitat, and biodiversity of species.

When overproduced macrophytes and algae die in eutrophic water, they decompose which further consumes dissolved oxygen. The depleted oxygen levels in turn may lead to fish kills and a range of other effects reducing biodiversity. Nutrients may become concentrated in an anoxic zone, often in deeper waters cut off by stratification of the water column and may only be made available again during autumn turn-over in temperate areas or in conditions of turbulent flow. The dead algae and organic load carried by the water inflows into a lake settle to the bottom and undergo anaerobic digestion releasing greenhouse gases such as methane and CO_{2}. Some of the methane gas may be oxidised by anaerobic methane oxidation bacteria such as Methylococcus capsulatus, which in turn may provide a food source for zooplankton. Thus a self-sustaining biological process can take place to generate primary food source for the phytoplankton and zooplankton depending on the availability of adequate dissolved oxygen in the water body.

Enhanced growth of aquatic vegetation, phytoplankton and algal blooms disrupts normal functioning of the ecosystem, causing a variety of problems such as a lack of oxygen which is needed for fish and shellfish to survive. The growth of dense algae in surface waters can shade the deeper water and reduce the viability of benthic shelter plants with resultant impacts on the wider ecosystem. Eutrophication also decreases the value of rivers, lakes and aesthetic enjoyment. Health problems can occur where eutrophic conditions interfere with drinking water treatment.

Phosphorus is often regarded as the main culprit in cases of eutrophication in lakes subjected to "point source" pollution from sewage pipes. The concentration of algae and the trophic state of lakes correspond well to phosphorus levels in water. Studies conducted in the Experimental Lakes Area in Ontario have shown a relationship between the addition of phosphorus and the rate of eutrophication. Later stages of eutrophication lead to blooms of nitrogen-fixing cyanobacteria limited solely by the phosphorus concentration. Phosphorus-base eutrophication in fresh water lakes has been addressed in several cases.

=== Coastal waters ===
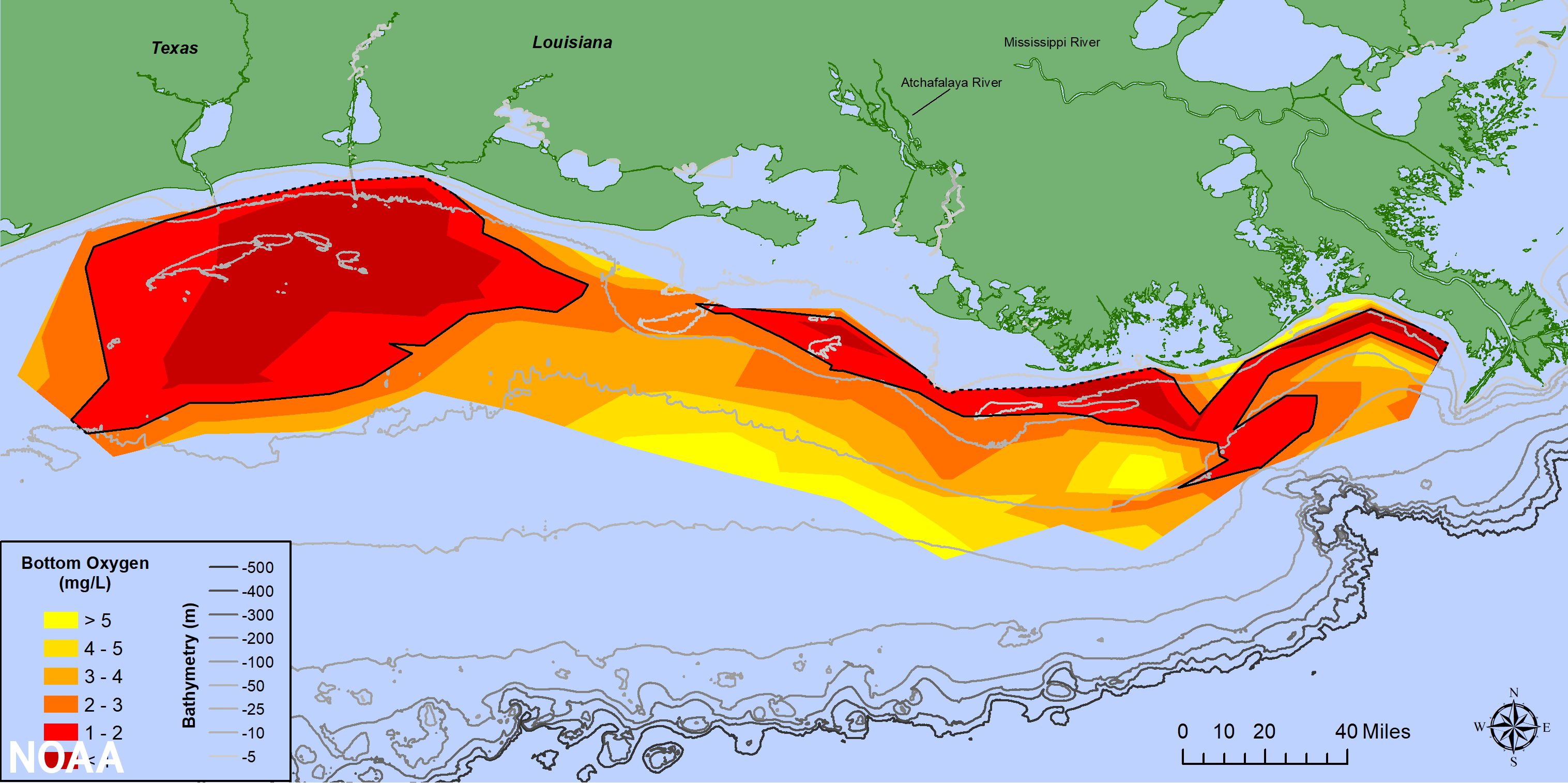
Map of measured Gulf hypoxia zone, July 25–31, 2021, LUMCON-NOAA

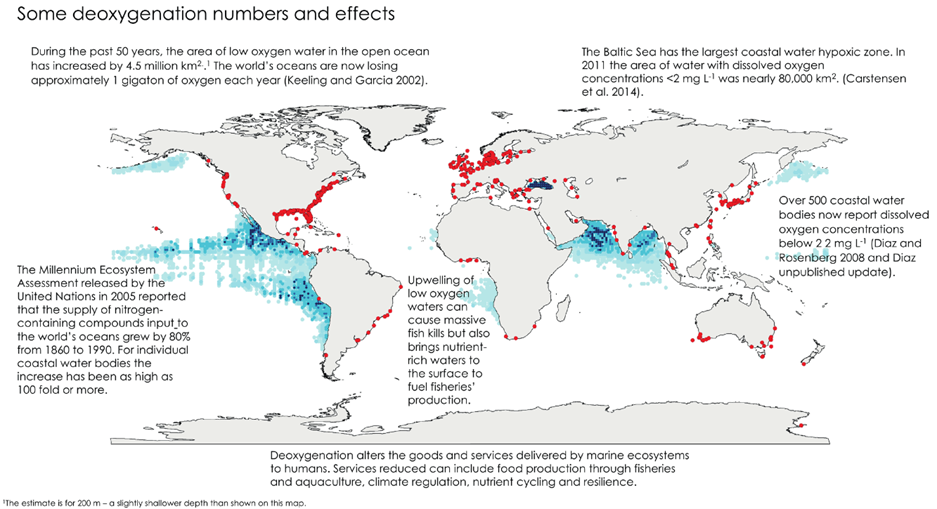
Oxygen minimum zones (OMZs) (blue) and areas with coastal hypoxia (red) in the world's ocean

Eutrophication is a common phenomenon in coastal waters, where nitrogenous sources are the main culprit. In coastal waters, nitrogen is commonly the key limiting nutrient of marine waters (unlike the freshwater systems where phosphorus is often the limiting nutrient). Therefore, nitrogen levels are more important than phosphorus levels for understanding and controlling eutrophication problems in salt water. Estuaries, as the interface between freshwater and saltwater, can be both phosphorus and nitrogen limited and commonly exhibit symptoms of eutrophication. Eutrophication in estuaries often results in bottom water hypoxia or anoxia, leading to fish kills and habitat degradation. Upwelling in coastal systems also promotes increased productivity by conveying deep, nutrient-rich waters to the surface, where the nutrients can be assimilated by algae.

Examples of anthropogenic sources of nitrogen-rich pollution to coastal waters include sea cage fish farming and discharges of ammonia from the production of coke from coal. In addition to runoff from land, wastes from fish farming and industrial ammonia discharges, atmospheric fixed nitrogen can be an important nutrient source in the open ocean. This could account for around one third of the ocean's external (non-recycled) nitrogen supply, and up to 3% of the annual new marine biological production.

Coastal waters embrace a wide range of marine habitats from enclosed estuaries to the open waters of the continental shelf. Phytoplankton productivity in coastal waters depends on both nutrient and light supply, with the latter an important limiting factor in waters near to shore where sediment resuspension often limits light penetration.

Nutrients are supplied to coastal waters from land via river and groundwater and also via the atmosphere. There is also an important source from the open ocean, via mixing of relatively nutrient rich deep ocean waters. Nutrient inputs from the ocean are little changed by human activity, although climate change may alter the water flows across the shelf break. By contrast, inputs from land to coastal zones of the nutrients nitrogen and phosphorus have been increased by human activity globally. The extent of increases varies greatly from place to place depending on human activities in the catchments. A third key nutrient, dissolved silicon, is derived primarily from sediment weathering to rivers and from offshore and is therefore much less affected by human activity.

==== Effects of coastal eutrophication ====
These increasing nitrogen and phosphorus nutrient inputs exert eutrophication pressures on coastal zones. These pressures vary geographically depending on the catchment activities and associated nutrient load. The geographical setting of the coastal zone is another important factor as it controls dilution of the nutrient load and oxygen exchange with the atmosphere. The effects of these eutrophication pressures can be seen in several different ways:

1. There is evidence from satellite monitoring that the amounts of chlorophyll as a measure of overall phytoplankton activity are increasing in many coastal areas worldwide due to increased nutrient inputs.
2. The phytoplankton species composition may change due to increased nutrient loadings and changes in the proportions of key nutrients. In particular the increases in nitrogen and phosphorus inputs, along with much smaller changes in silicon inputs, create changes in the ratio of nitrogen and phosphorus to silicon. These changing nutrient ratios drive changes in phytoplankton species composition, particularly disadvantaging silica rich phytoplankton species like diatoms compared to other species. This process leads to the development of nuisance algal blooms in areas such as the North Sea (see also OSPAR Convention) and the Black Sea. In some cases nutrient enrichment can lead to harmful algal blooms (HABs). Such blooms can occur naturally, but there is good evidence that these are increasing as a result of nutrient enrichment, although the causal linkage between nutrient enrichment and HABs is not straightforward.
3. Oxygen depletion has existed in some coastal seas such as the Baltic for thousands of years. In such areas the density structure of the water column severely restricts water column mixing and associated oxygenation of deep water. However, increases in the inputs of bacterially degradable organic matter to such isolated deep waters can exacerbate such oxygen depletion in oceans. These areas of lower dissolved oxygen have increased globally in recent decades. They are usually connected with nutrient enrichment and resulting algal blooms. Climate change will generally tend to increase water column stratification and so exacerbate this oxygen depletion problem. An example of such coastal oxygen depletion is in the Gulf of Mexico where an area of seasonal anoxia more than 5000 square miles in area has developed since the 1950s. The increased primary production driving this anoxia is fueled by nutrients supplied by the Mississippi river. A similar process has been documented in the Black Sea.
4. Hypolimnetic oxygen depletion can lead to summer "kills". During summer stratification, inputs or organic matter and sedimentation of primary producers can increase rates of respiration in the hypolimnion. If oxygen depletion becomes extreme, aerobic organisms (such as fish) may die, resulting in what is known as a "summer kill".

== Extent of the problem ==
Surveys showed that 54% of lakes in Asia are eutrophic; in Europe, 53%; in North America, 48%; in South America, 41%; and in Africa, 28%. In South Africa, a study by the CSIR using remote sensing has shown more than 60% of the reservoirs surveyed were eutrophic.

The World Resources Institute has identified 375 hypoxic coastal zones in the world, concentrated in coastal areas in Western Europe, the Eastern and Southern coasts of the US, and East Asia, particularly Japan.

== Prevention ==
=== Minimizing pollution from sewage ===
There are multiple different ways to fix cultural eutrophication with raw sewage being a point source of pollution. For example, sewage treatment plants can be upgraded for biological nutrient removal so that they discharge much less nitrogen and phosphorus to the receiving water body. However, even with good secondary treatment, most final effluents from sewage treatment works contain substantial concentrations of nitrogen as nitrate, nitrite or ammonia. Removal of these nutrients is an expensive and often difficult process.

Laws regulating the discharge and treatment of sewage have led to dramatic nutrient reductions to surrounding ecosystems. As a major contributor to the nonpoint source nutrient loading of water bodies is untreated domestic sewage, it is necessary to provide treatment facilities to highly urbanized areas, particularly those in developing countries, in which treatment of domestic waste water is a scarcity. The technology to safely and efficiently reuse wastewater, both from domestic and industrial sources, should be a primary concern for policy regarding eutrophication.

=== Minimizing nutrient pollution by agriculture ===
There are many ways to help fix cultural eutrophication caused by agriculture. Some recommendations issued by the U.S. Department of Agriculture include:

1. Nutrient management techniques - Anyone using fertilizers should apply fertilizer in the correct amount, at the right time of year, with the right method and placement. Organically fertilized fields can "significantly reduce harmful nitrate leaching" compared to conventionally fertilized fields. Eutrophication impacts are in some cases higher from organic production than they are from conventional production. In Japan the amount of nitrogen produced by livestock is adequate to serve the fertilizer needs for the agriculture industry.
2. Year-round ground cover - a cover crop will prevent periods of bare ground thus eliminating erosion and runoff of nutrients even after the growing season has passed.
3. Planting field buffers - Planting trees, shrubs and grasses along the edges of fields can help catch the runoff and absorb some nutrients before the water makes it to a nearby water body. Riparian buffer zones are interfaces between a flowing body of water and land, and have been created near waterways in an attempt to filter pollutants; sediment and nutrients are deposited here instead of in water. Creating buffer zones near farms and roads is another possible way to prevent nutrients from traveling too far.
4. Conservation tillage - By reducing frequency and intensity of tilling, the land will enhance the chance of nutrients absorbing into the ground.

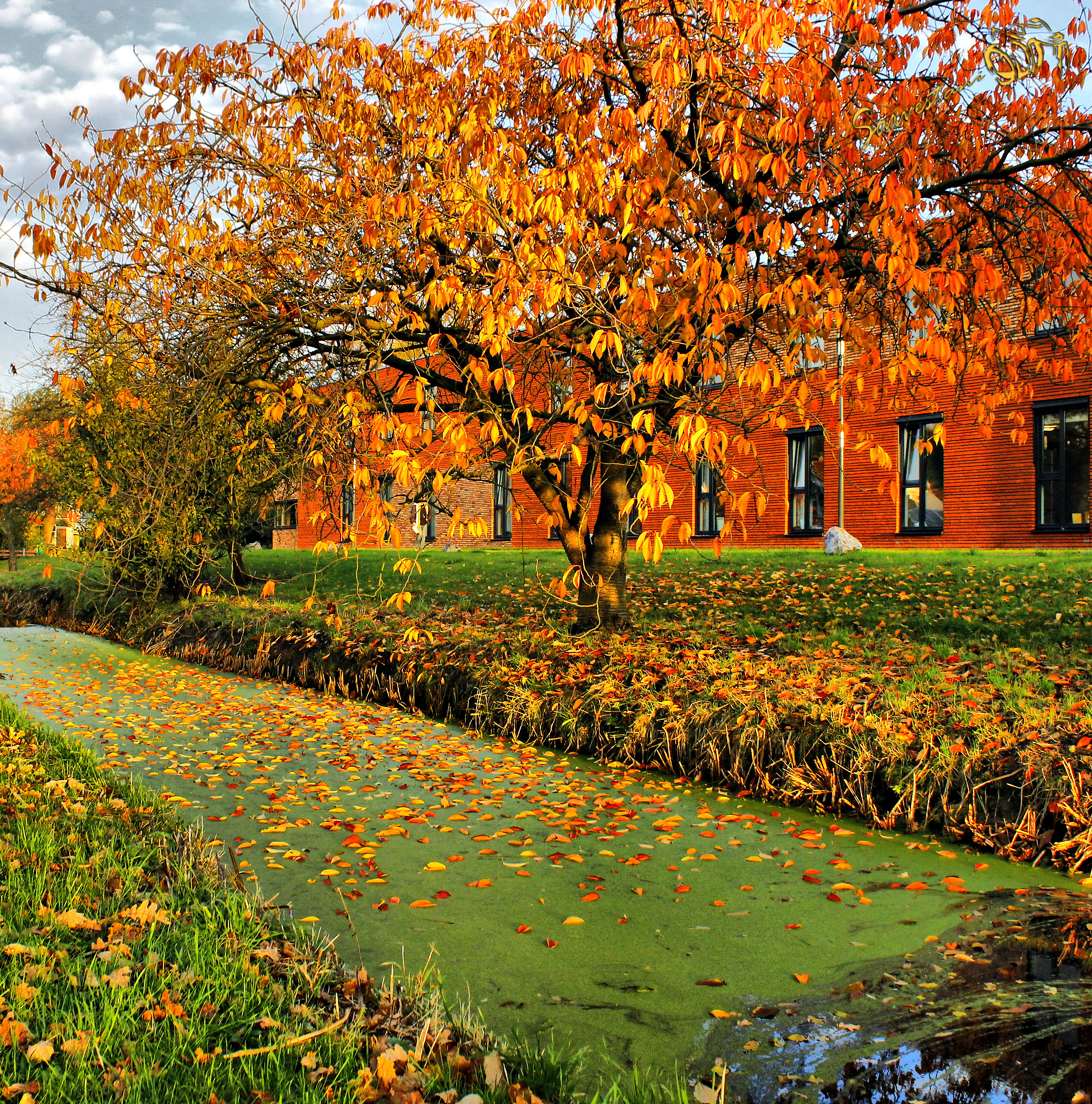
Eutrophication in a canal

=== Policy ===
The United Nations framework for Sustainable Development Goals recognizes the damaging effects of eutrophication for marine environments. It has established a timeline for creating an Index of Coastal Eutrophication and Floating Plastic Debris Density (ICEP) within Sustainable Development Goal 14 (life below water). SDG 14 specifically has a target to: "by 2025, prevent and significantly reduce marine pollution of all kinds, in particular from land-based activities, including marine debris and nutrient pollution".

Policy and regulations are a set of tools to minimize causes of eutrophication. Nonpoint sources of pollution are the primary contributors to eutrophication, and their effects can be minimized through common agricultural practices. Reducing the amount of pollutants that reach a watershed can be achieved through the protection of its forest cover, reducing the amount of erosion leeching into a watershed. Also, through the efficient, controlled use of land using sustainable agricultural practices to minimize land degradation, the amount of soil runoff and nitrogen-based fertilizers reaching a watershed can be reduced. Waste disposal technology constitutes another factor in eutrophication prevention.

The current policies proposed are mainly command-and-control policies, which are based on commonly used regulation standards. Although these policies are easier to implement, they are not as cost-effective. This typically involves implementing limitations on input resources, emissions, or technologies, which are all common command-and-control policies that have been implemented by multiple countries.

Because a body of water can have an effect on a range of people reaching far beyond that of the watershed, cooperation between different organizations is necessary to prevent the intrusion of contaminants that can lead to eutrophication. Agencies ranging from state governments to those of water resource management and non-governmental organizations, going as low as the local population, are responsible for preventing eutrophication of water bodies. In the United States, the most well known inter-state effort to prevent eutrophication is the Chesapeake Bay.

== Reversal and remediation ==
Reducing nutrient inputs is a crucial precondition for restoration. Still, there are two caveats: Firstly, it can take a long time, mainly because of the storage of nutrients in sediments. Secondly, restoration may need more than a simple reversal of inputs since there are sometimes several stable but very different ecological states. Recovery of eutrophicated lakes is slow, often requiring several decades.

In environmental remediation, nutrient removal technologies include biofiltration, which uses living material to capture and biologically degrade pollutants. Examples include green belts, riparian areas, natural and constructed wetlands, and treatment ponds.

=== Algae bloom forecasting ===
The National Oceanic Atmospheric Admiration in the United States has created a forecasting tool for regions such as the Great Lakes, the Gulf of Maine, and The Gulf of Mexico. Shorter term predictions can help to show the intensity, location, and trajectory of blooms in order to warn more directly affected communities. Longer term tests in specific regions and bodies help to predict larger scale factors like scale of future blooms and factors that could lead to more adverse effects.

=== Nutrient bioextraction ===
Nutrient bioextraction is bioremediation involving cultured plants and animals. Nutrient bioextraction or bioharvesting is the practice of farming and harvesting shellfish and seaweed to remove nitrogen and other nutrients from natural water bodies.

==== Shellfish in estuaries ====
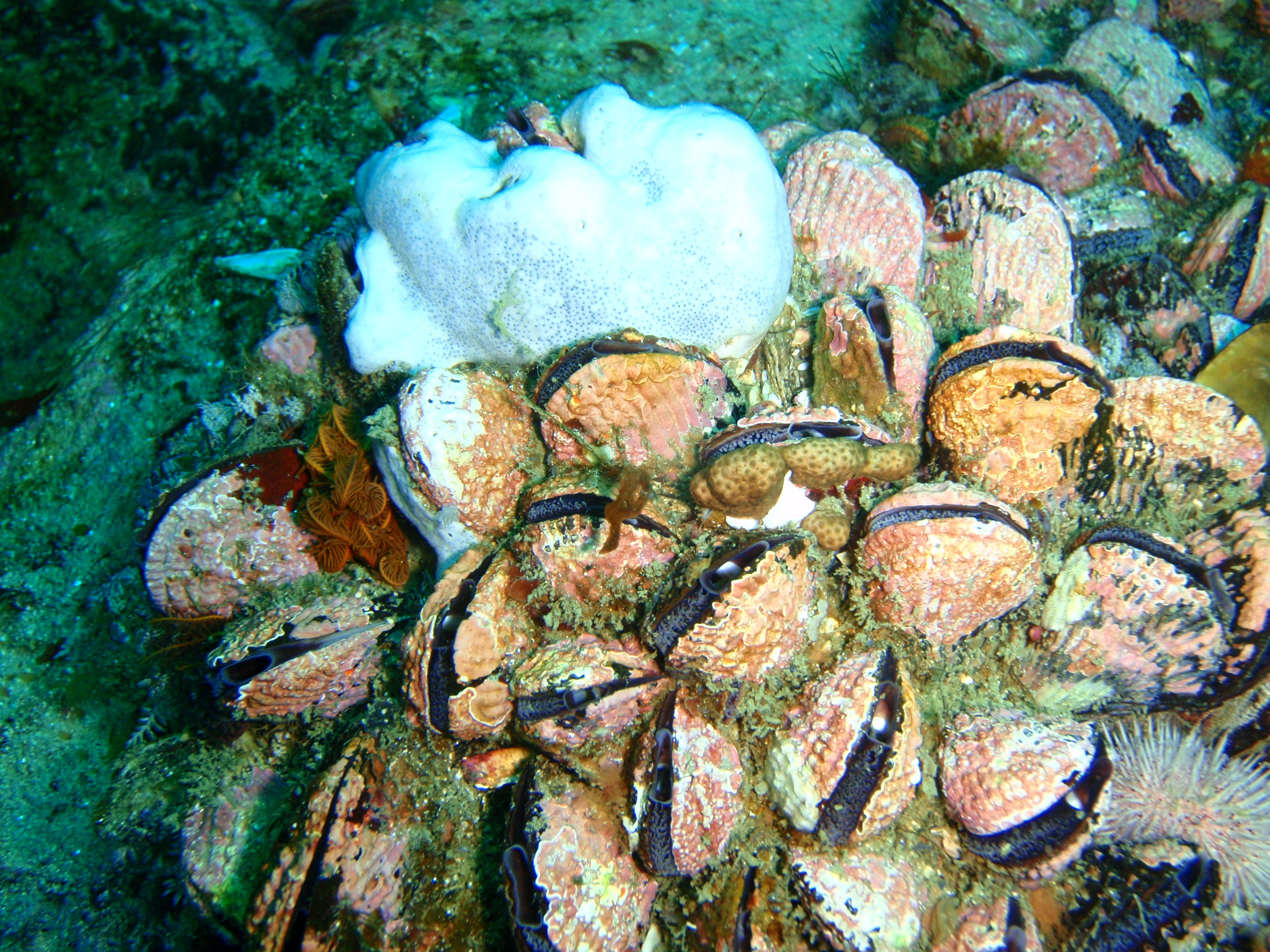
Mussels are an example of organisms that act as nutrient bioextractors. They consume the nitrogen in water, depleting algae of their nutrients.

It has been suggested that nitrogen removal by oyster reefs could generate net benefits for sources facing nitrogen emission restrictions, similar to other nutrient trading scenarios. Specifically, if oysters maintain nitrogen levels in estuaries below thresholds, then oysters effectively stave off an enforcement response, and compliance costs parties responsible for nitrogen emission would otherwise incur. Several studies have shown that oysters and mussels can dramatically impact nitrogen levels in estuaries. Filter feeding activity is considered beneficial to water quality by controlling phytoplankton density and sequestering nutrients, which can be removed from the system through shellfish harvest, buried in the sediments, or lost through denitrification. Foundational work toward the idea of improving marine water quality through shellfish cultivation was conducted by Odd Lindahl et al., using mussels in Sweden. In the United States, shellfish restoration projects have been conducted on the East, West and Gulf coasts.

==== Seaweed farming ====
Studies have demonstrated seaweed's potential to improve nitrogen levels. Seaweed aquaculture offers an opportunity to mitigate, and adapt to climate change. Seaweed, such as kelp, also absorbs phosphorus and nitrogen and is thus helpful to remove excessive nutrients from polluted parts of the sea. Some cultivated seaweeds have very high productivity and could absorb large quantities of N, P, CO_{2}, producing large amounts of O_{2} having an excellent effect on decreasing eutrophication. It is believed that seaweed cultivation in large scale should be a good solution to the eutrophication problem in coastal waters.

=== Geo-engineering ===
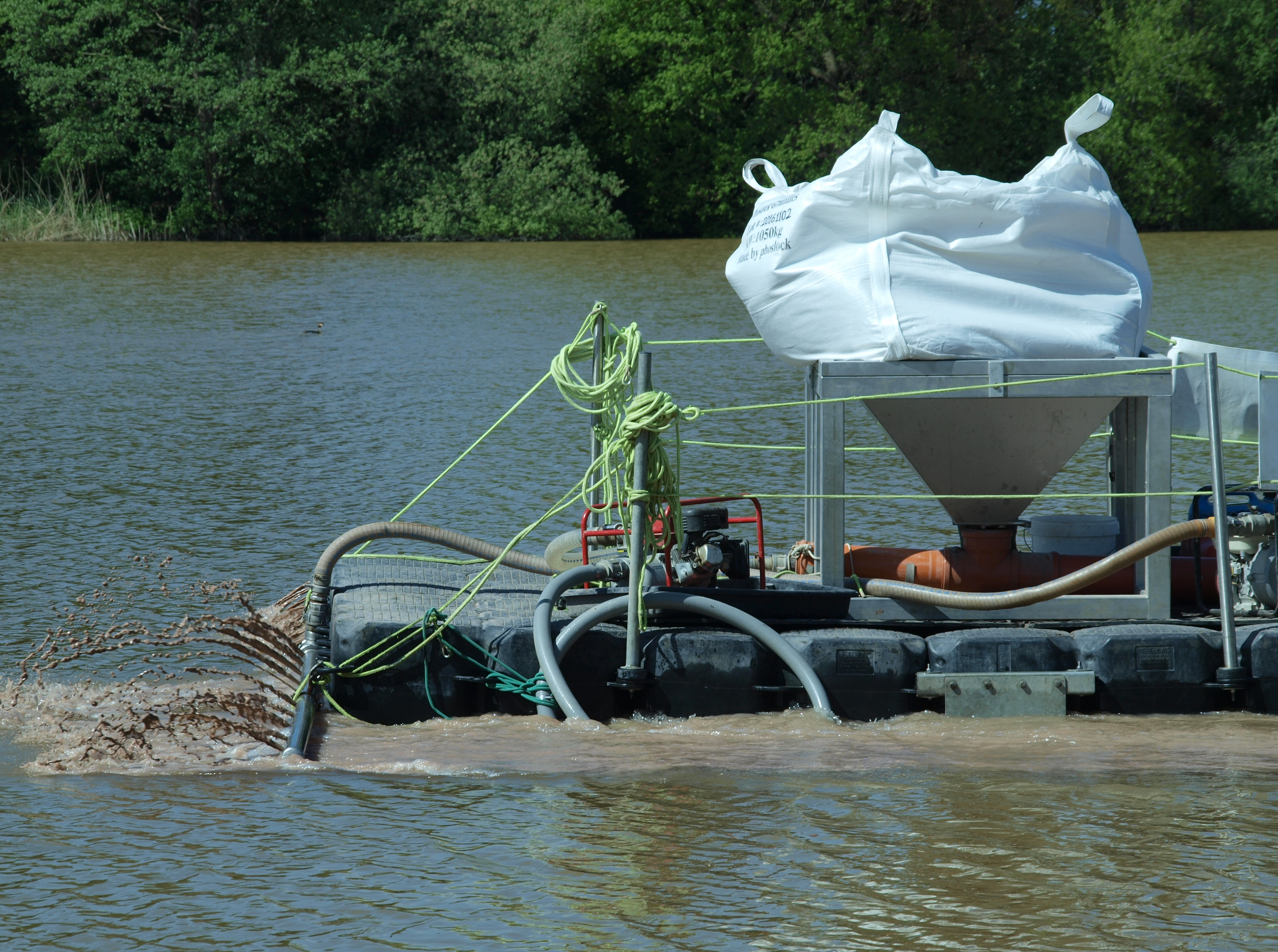
Application of a phosphorus sorbent to a lake - The Netherlands

Another technique for combatting hypoxia/eutrophication in localized situations is direct injection of compressed air, a technique used in the restoration of the Salford Docks area of the Manchester Ship Canal in England. For smaller-scale waters such as aquaculture ponds, pump aeration is standard.

=== Chemical removal of phosphorus ===
Removing phosphorus can remediate eutrophication. Of the several phosphate sorbents, alum (aluminium sulfate) is of practical interest.) Many materials have been investigated. The phosphate sorbent is commonly applied in the surface of the water body and it sinks to the bottom of the lake reducing phosphate, such sorbents have been applied worldwide to manage eutrophication and algal bloom (for example under the commercial name Phoslock). In a large-scale study, 114 lakes were monitored for the effectiveness of alum at phosphorus reduction. Across all lakes, alum effectively reduced the phosphorus for 11 years. While there was variety in longevity (21 years in deep lakes and 5.7 years in shallow lakes), the results express the effectiveness of alum at controlling phosphorus within lakes. Alum treatment is less effective in deep lakes, as well as lakes with substantial external phosphorus loading.

Finnish phosphorus removal measures started in the mid-1970s and have targeted rivers and lakes polluted by industrial and municipal discharges. These efforts have had a 90% removal efficiency. Still, some targeted point sources did not show a decrease in runoff despite reduction efforts.

== See also ==
- Biogeochemical cycle – Chemical transfer pathway between Earth's biological and non-biological parts
- Ecological Quality Ratio – Directive
- Effluent – Liquid waste or sewage discharged into a river or the sea
- Nitrogen cycle – Biogeochemical cycle by which nitrogen is converted into various chemical forms
- Trophic state index – Measure of the ability of water to sustain biological productivity
- Upland and lowland (freshwater ecology) – Types of plain
- Water Framework Directive
