= Phoslock =

Phoslock is the commercial name for a bentonite clay in which the sodium and/or calcium ions are exchanged for lanthanum. The lanthanum contained within Phoslock reacts with phosphate to form an inert mineral known as rhabdophane ($\ce{LaPO4.\mathit{n}H2O}$). Phoslock is used in lake restoration projects to remove excess phosphorus from aquatic systems, thereby improving water quality and inducing biological recovery in impaired freshwater systems.

It was developed in Australia by the CSIRO in the late 1990s by Dr Grant Douglas (US Patent 6350383) as a way of utilising the ability of lanthanum to bind phosphate in freshwater natural aquatic systems. The first large-scale trial took place in January 2000 in the Canning River, Western Australia.

During its development, patenting and commercialisation by CSIRO and subsequent commercial production, Phoslock has been a subject in academic research and has been used globally in lake restoration projects. The largest number of whole lake applications and the most comprehensive pre- and post-application monitoring has taken place in Europe, primarily Germany (where it is sold under the tradename Bentophos), the Netherlands and the UK.

There are studies indicating that lanthanum release due to application of this clay could lead to increased concentrations of this rare element in water and soils, resulting in bioaccumulation in animal tissues and there are still concerns and precautions to be taken as currently there is not enough complete and independent information.

== See also ==
- Eutrophication
- Harmful algal bloom
