= Baltic Sea hypoxia =

Low levels of oxygen in bottom waters occurring regularly in the Baltic Sea

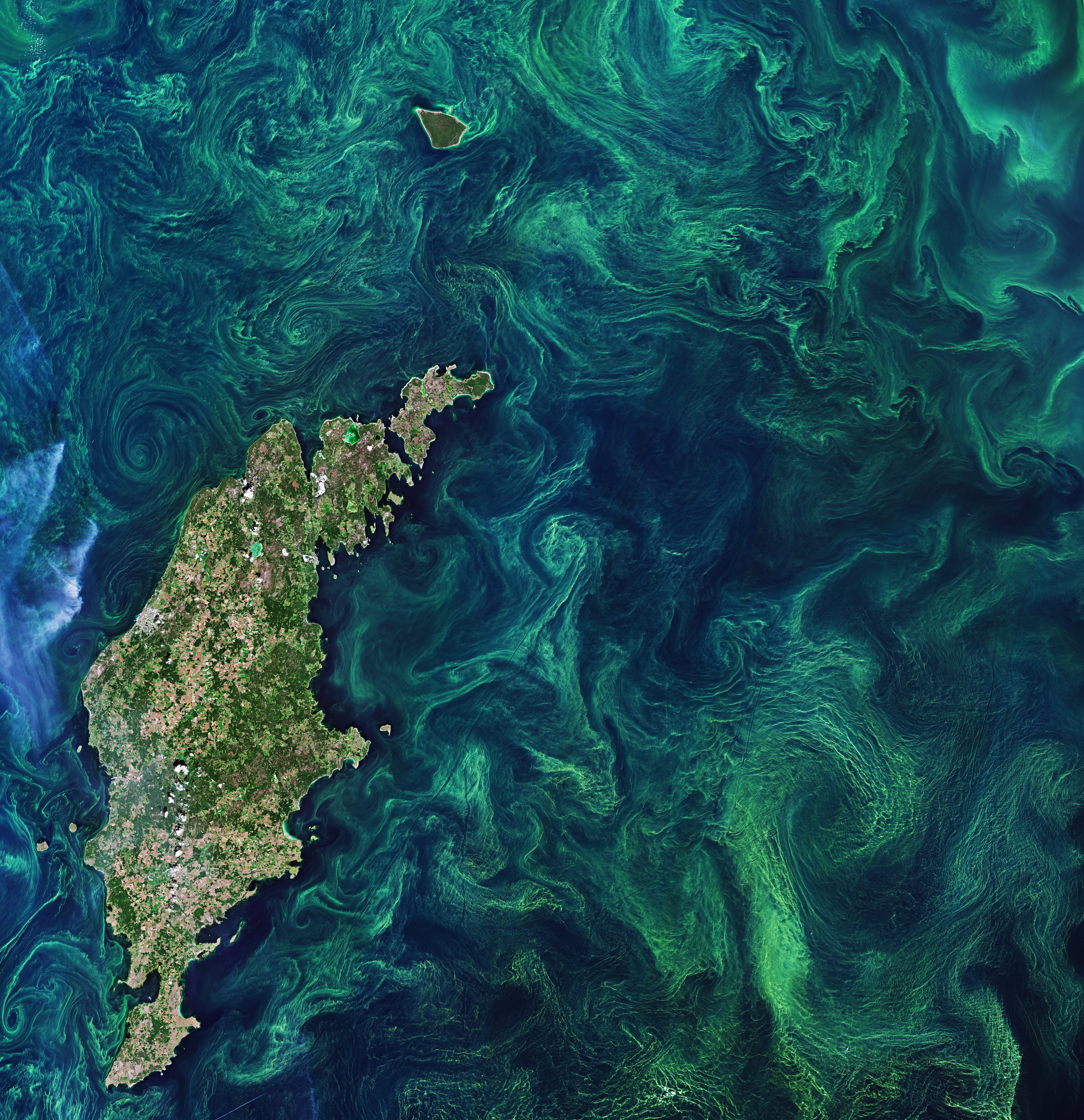
Satellite photo of the Baltic Sea surrounding Gotland, Sweden, with algae bloom (phytoplankton) swirling in the water

Baltic Sea hypoxia refers to low levels of oxygen in bottom waters, also known as hypoxia, occurring regularly in the Baltic Sea. As of 2009 the total area of bottom covered with hypoxic waters with oxygen concentrations less than 2 mg/L in the Baltic Sea has averaged 49,000 km^{2} over the last 40 years. The ultimate cause of hypoxia is excess nutrient loading from human activities causing algal blooms. The blooms sink to the bottom and use oxygen to decompose at a rate faster than it can be added back into the system through the physical processes of mixing. The lack of oxygen (anoxia) kills bottom-living organisms and creates dead zones.

== Causes ==
The rapid increase in hypoxia in coastal areas around the world is due to the excessive inputs of plant nutrients, such as nitrogen and phosphorus by human activities. The sources of these nutrients include agriculture, sewage, and atmospheric deposition of nitrogen containing compounds from the burning of fossil fuels. The nutrients stimulate the growth of algae causing problems with eutrophication. The algae sink to the bottom and use the oxygen when they decompose. If mixing of the bottom waters is slow, such that oxygen stocks are not renewed, hypoxia can occur.

== Drivers and Risk Factors ==
Key contributors to Baltic Sea hypoxia include: Intensive agriculture and fertilizer use in surrounding countries, inadequate wastewater treatment infrastructure, and atmospheric nitrogen deposition from fossil fuel combustion.

Climate change, which: Increases water temperature, enhances stratification (reducing oxygen mixing), and prolongs algal bloom seasons.

== Description ==
As of 2009 the total area of bottom covered with hypoxic waters with oxygen concentrations less than 2 mg/L in the Baltic Sea has averaged 49,000 km^{2} over the last 40 years. In the Baltic Sea, the input of salt water from the North Sea through the Danish Straits is important in determining the area of hypoxia each year. Denser, saltier water comes into the Baltic Sea and flows along the bottom. Although large salt water inputs help to renew the bottom waters and increase oxygen concentrations, the new oxygen added with the salt water inflow is rapidly used to decompose organic matter that is in the sediments. The denser salt water also reduces mixing of oxygen poor bottom waters with more brackish, lighter surface waters. Thus, large areas of hypoxia occur when more salt water comes into the Baltic Sea.

== Geological perspective ==
Geological archives in sediments, primarily the appearance of laminated sediments that occur only when hypoxic conditions are present, are used to determine the historical time frame of oxygen conditions.

Hypoxic conditions were common during the development of the early Baltic Sea called the Mastogloia Sea and Littorina Sea starting around 8,000 calendar years Before Present until 4,000 BP. Hypoxia disappeared for a period of nearly 2,000 years, appearing a second time just before the Medieval Warm Period around 1 AD until 1200 AD. The Baltic Sea became hypoxic again around 1900 AD and has remained hypoxic for the last 100 years.

The causes of the various periods of hypoxia are being scientifically debated, but it is believed to result from high surface salinity, climate and human impacts.

== Impacts ==
The deficiency of oxygen in bottom waters changes the types of organisms that live on the bottom. The species change from long-living, deep-burrowing, slow-growing animals to species that live on the sediment surface. They are small and fast-growing, and can tolerate low concentrations of oxygen. When oxygen concentrations are low enough only bacteria and fungi can survive, dead zones form. In the Baltic Sea, low oxygen concentrations also reduce the ability of cod to spawn in bottom waters. Cod spawning requires both high salinity and high oxygen concentrations for cod fry to develop, conditions that are rare in the Baltic Sea today. The lack of oxygen also increases the release of phosphorus from bottom sediments. Excess phosphorus in surface waters and the lack of nitrogen stimulates the growth of cyanobacteria. When the cyanobacteria die and sink to the bottom they consume oxygen leading to further hypoxia and more phosphorus is released from bottom sediments. This process creates a vicious circle of eutrophication that helps to sustain itself.

== Environmental Impact ==
Hypoxia has severe consequences for marine ecosystems, including:

1. Loss of biodiversity due to oxygen-sensitive species dying or migrating 2. Disruption of food webs, particularly affecting benthic organisms 3. Release of phosphorus from sediments, further exacerbating eutrophication (positive feedback loop)

Persistent hypoxia alters ecosystem structure and reduces the resilience of marine environments.

== Animal Health Impact ==
Low oxygen conditions directly affect marine animals:

1. Fish species such as cod experience reduced reproduction and habitat loss 2. Benthic organisms (e.g., mollusks, worms) suffer mass mortality 3. Altered food availability impacts higher trophic levels, including birds and marine mammals

These changes can lead to long-term declines in fish populations and ecosystem productivity.

== Human Health and Societal Impact ==
Baltic Sea hypoxia has indirect but important effects on human health and livelihoods:

1. Food security risks due to declining fish stocks 2. Exposure to harmful algal blooms (HABs), which can produce toxins affecting drinking water and seafood safety 3. Economic losses in fisheries and tourism industries 4. Recreational water use limitations due to poor water quality

From a One Health perspective, these impacts demonstrate how environmental degradation can translate into population-level health and economic consequences.

== Prevention and Mitigation Strategies ==
Efforts to address Baltic Sea hypoxia involve coordinated international action:

1. Policy and Governance The Baltic Sea Action Plan (BSAP), coordinated by HELCOM, aims to reduce nutrient inputs and restore good ecological status of the Baltic Sea. European Union directives, including the Water Framework Directive and the Nitrates Directive, regulate water quality and agricultural nutrient pollution across member states.

2. Agricultural Interventions Reducing fertilizer application and improving nutrient management practices can significantly decrease nitrogen and phosphorus runoff. Implementation of buffer zones, wetland restoration, and sustainable farming practices helps limit nutrient transport into waterways.

3. Wastewater Management Upgrading wastewater treatment plants to include advanced nutrient removal technologies has been shown to reduce phosphorus and nitrogen discharge. Improvements in urban sanitation infrastructure further contribute to lowering nutrient inputs into the Baltic Sea.^{[4]}

4. Climate Action Reducing greenhouse gas emissions and addressing climate change are critical, as warming temperatures and increased stratification exacerbate hypoxia. Integrating climate adaptation strategies into marine and coastal management is increasingly recommended.

== Solutions ==
The countries surrounding the Baltic Sea have established the HELCOM Baltic Marine Environment Protection Commission to protect and improve the environmental health of the Baltic Sea. In 2007, the Member States accepted the Baltic Sea Action Plan to reduce nutrients. Because the public and media have been frustrated by the lack of progress in improving the environmental status of the Baltic Sea, there have been calls for large-scale engineering solutions to add oxygen back into bottom waters and bring life back to the dead zones. An international committee evaluated different ideas and came to the conclusion that large-scale engineering approaches are not able to add oxygen to the extremely large dead zones in the Baltic Sea without completely changing the Baltic Sea ecosystem. The best long-term solution is to implement policies and measures to reduce the load of nutrients to the Baltic Sea.

== One Health Perspective ==
Baltic Sea hypoxia exemplifies the One Health framework by illustrating the interconnectedness of environmental, animal, and human health systems.

Nutrient pollution from agriculture and wastewater contributes to ecosystem degradation, which in turn affects marine biodiversity and fisheries. The loss of oxygen in bottom waters leads to declines in fish populations and disruption of food webs, with implications for food security and economic stability in coastal communities.

Additionally, eutrophication promotes harmful algal blooms, some of which produce toxins that can impact human health through contaminated seafood and recreational water exposure. These interactions demonstrate how environmental changes can translate into population-level health risks.

From a One Health perspective, addressing Baltic Sea hypoxia requires coordinated action across environmental management, agricultural policy, and public health sectors, emphasizing the need for interdisciplinary collaboration.
