= Lanthanum carbonate =

Ore of lanthanum metal

Names
- IUPAC name Lanthanum carbonate
- Other names Fosrenol

Identifiers
CAS Number	587-26-8
3D model (JSmol)	Interactive image
ChEMBL	ChEMBL2096647
ChemSpider	147758
ECHA InfoCard	100.008.728
EC Number	209-599-5
KEGG	D04667
PubChem CID	168924
UNII	0M78EU4V9H
CompTox Dashboard (EPA)	DTXSID30890512
- InChI: InChI=1S/3CH2O3.2La/c3*2-1(3)4;;/h3*(H2,2,3,4);;/q;;;2*+3/p-6 Key: NZPIUJUFIFZSPW-UHFFFAOYSA-H; InChI=1/3CH2O3.2La/c3*2-1(3)4;;/h3*(H2,2,3,4);;/q;;;2*+3/p-6 Key: NZPIUJUFIFZSPW-CYFPFDDLAT
- SMILES: [La+3].[La+3].O=C([O-])[O-].[O-]C([O-])=O.[O-]C([O-])=O

Properties
Chemical formula	La_{2}(CO_{3})_{3}
Molar mass	457.838 g/mol
Appearance	White powder, hygroscopic
Density	2.6–2.7 g/cm^{3}
Melting point	decomposes
Solubility in water	negligible
Solubility	soluble in acids

Pharmacology
ATC code	V03AE03 (WHO)
Legal status	CA: ℞-only

Related compounds
Other anions	Lanthanum(III) oxide
- Except where otherwise noted, data are given for materials in their standard state (at 25 °C [77 °F], 100 kPa). verify (what is ?) Infobox references

Lanthanum carbonate, La_{2}(CO_{3})_{3}, is the salt formed by lanthanum(III) cations and carbonate anions.

== Chemistry ==
Lanthanum carbonate is used as a starting material in lanthanum chemistry, particularly in forming mixed oxides, for example

- for production of lanthanum strontium manganite, primarily for solid oxide fuel cell applications;
- for production of certain high-temperature superconductors, such as La_{2-x}Sr_{x}CuO_{2}.

== Medical uses ==
Lanthanum carbonate is used in medicine as a phosphate binder. As a medication it is sold under the trade name Fosrenol by the pharmaceutical company Shire Pharmaceuticals. Due to its large size (1000 mg tablet is 2.2 cm in diameter), it may be possible to choke on the tablet if it is not chewed. It is prescribed for the treatment of hyperphosphatemia, primarily in patients with chronic kidney disease. It is taken with meals and binds to dietary phosphate, preventing phosphate from being absorbed by the intestine. For cats with hyperphosphatemia it is available under the trade name Renalzin by Bayer Animal Health.

However, when lanthanum carbonate is used for treating hyperphosphatemia, its side effects, namely myalgia, muscular cramping, and peripheral edema, should be clinically monitored.

== Other applications ==
Lanthanum carbonate is also used for the tinting of glass, for water treatment, and as a catalyst for hydrocarbon cracking.
