= Chronic kidney disease–mineral and bone disorder =

Complication of chronic kidney disease

- Specialty: Nephrology

Chronic kidney disease–mineral and bone disorder (CKD–MBD) is one of the many complications associated with chronic kidney disease. It represents a systemic disorder of mineral and bone metabolism due to CKD manifested by either one or a combination of the following:

- Abnormalities of calcium, phosphorus (phosphate), parathyroid hormone, or vitamin D metabolism
- Abnormalities in bone turnover, mineralization, volume, linear growth, or strength
- Vascular or other soft-tissue calcification

CKD–MBD explains, at least in part, the high morbidity and mortality of CKD patients, linking kidney and bone disease with cardiovascular complications. It is a matter of discussion whether CKD–MBD may be considered a real syndrome or not.

CKD–MBD broadens the "old" concept of "renal osteodystrophy", which now should be restricted to describing the bone pathology associated with CKD. Thus, renal osteodystrophy is currently considered one measure of the skeletal component of the systemic disorder of CKD–MBD that is quantifiable by histomorphometry of bone biopsy. New guidelines have been recently released.

== Pathophysiology ==
It is well known that as kidney function declines, there is a progressive deterioration in mineral homeostasis, with a disruption of normal serum and tissue concentrations of phosphorus and calcium, and changes in circulating levels of hormones. These include parathyroid hormone (PTH), 25-hydroxyvitamin D (25(OH) vitamin D; calcidiol), 1,25-dihydroxyvitamin D (1,25(OH)2 vitamin D; calcitriol), and other vitamin D metabolites, fibroblast growth factor 23 (FGF-23), and growth hormone. Beginning in CKD stage 3, the ability of the kidneys to appropriately excrete a phosphate load is diminished, leading to hyperphosphatemia, elevated PTH (secondary hyperparathyroidism), and decreased 1,25(OH)2 vitamin D with associated elevations in the levels of FGF-23. The conversion of 25(OH) vitamin D to 1,25(OH)2 vitamin D is impaired, reducing intestinal calcium absorption and increasing PTH. The kidney fails to respond adequately to PTH, which normally promotes phosphaturia and calcium reabsorption, or to FGF-23, which also enhances phosphate excretion. In addition, there is evidence at the tissue level of a downregulation of vitamin D receptor and of resistance to the actions of PTH. Therapy is generally focused on correcting biochemical and hormonal abnormalities in an effort to limit their consequences.

The mineral and endocrine functions disrupted in CKD are critically important in the regulation of both initial bone formation during growth (bone modeling) and bone structure and function during adulthood (bone remodeling). As a result, bone abnormalities are found almost universally in patients with CKD requiring dialysis (stage 5D), and in the majority of patients with CKD stages 3–5. More recently, there has been an increasing concern of extraskeletal calcification that may result from the deranged mineral and bone metabolism of CKD and from the therapies used to correct these abnormalities.

Numerous cohort studies have shown associations between disorders of mineral metabolism and fractures, cardiovascular disease, and mortality. These observational studies have broadened the focus of CKD-related mineral and bone disorders (MBDs) to include cardiovascular disease (which is the leading cause of death in patients at all stages of CKD). All three of these processes (abnormal mineral metabolism, abnormal bone, and extraskeletal calcification) are closely interrelated and together make a major contribution to the morbidity and mortality of patients with CKD. The traditional definition of renal osteodystrophy did not accurately encompass this more diverse clinical spectrum, based on serum biomarkers, noninvasive imaging, and bone abnormalities. The absence of a generally accepted definition and diagnosis of renal osteodystrophy prompted Kidney Disease: Improving Global Outcomes (KDIGO) to sponsor a controversies conference, entitled Definition, Evaluation, and Classification of Renal Osteodystrophy, in 2005. The principal conclusion was that the term CKD–Mineral and Bone Disorder (CKD–MBD) should now be used to describe the "broader clinical syndrome encompassing mineral, bone, and calcific cardiovascular abnormalities that develop as a complication of CKD".

== Treatment ==
Treatment efforts may involve many clinical and diagnostic manoeuvers, such as trying to decrease phosphate, normalize vitamin D (calcidiol levels) or decrease PTH and/or alkaline phosphatase levels. However, there is an important lack of randomized clinical studies and recent guidelines (KDIGO 2017) have been recently released on the topic. Although it was previously considered, normalization of calcemia is not included in modern treatment goals since the advent of calcimimetics.
