= Phosphate binder =

Medication used to reduce the absorption of phosphate

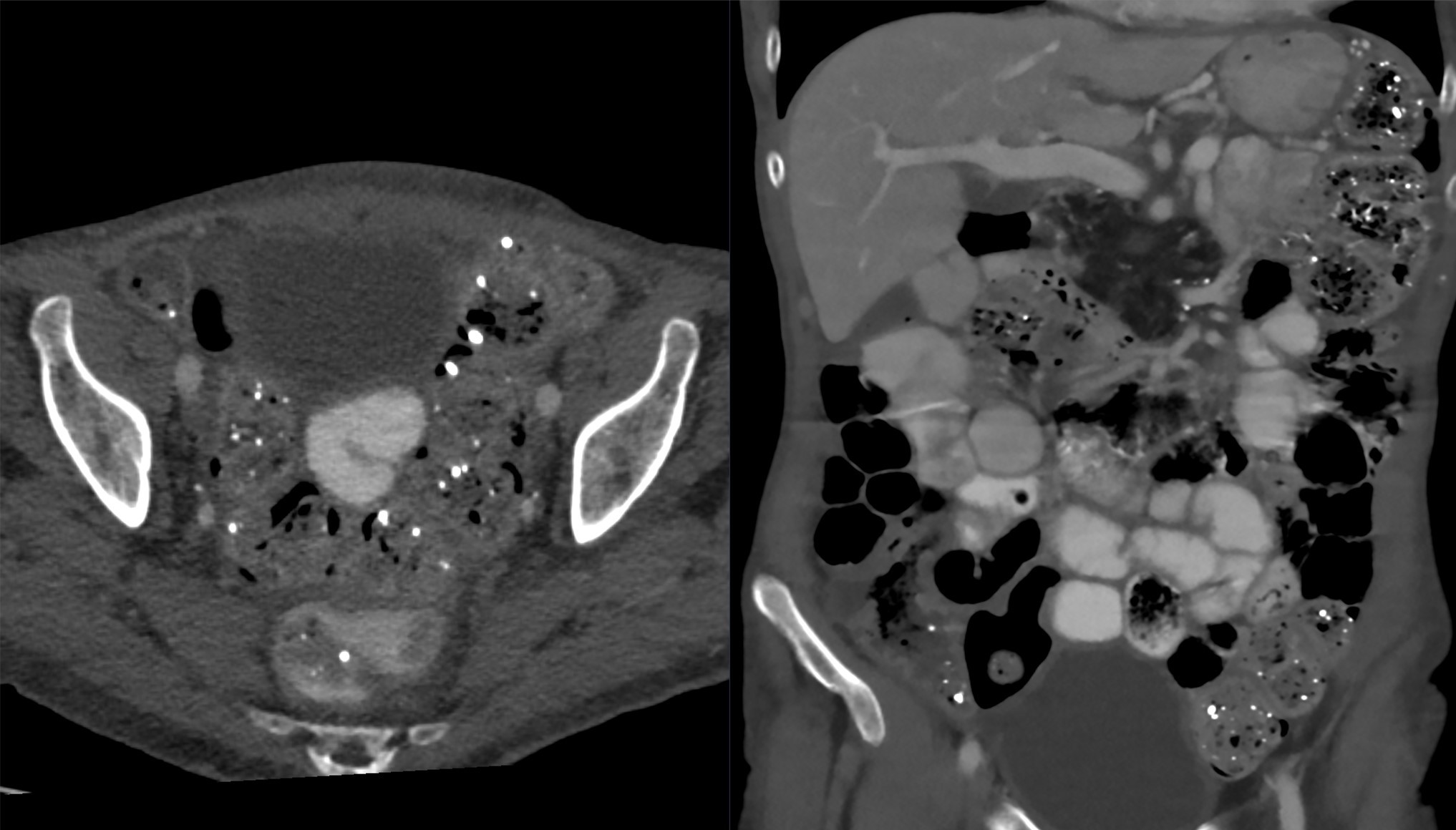
Phosphate binders in the colon, visible in computed tomography as multiple small radiopaque foreign bodies.

Phosphate binders are medications used to reduce the absorption of dietary phosphate; they are taken along with meals and snacks. They are frequently used in people with chronic kidney failure (CKF), who are less able to excrete phosphate, resulting in an elevated serum phosphate.

== Mechanism of action ==
These agents work by binding to phosphate in the GI tract, thereby making it unavailable to the body for absorption. Hence, these drugs are usually taken with meals to bind any phosphate that may be present in the ingested food. Phosphate binders may be simple molecular entities (such as magnesium, aluminium, calcium, or lanthanum salts) that react with phosphate and form an insoluble compound.

Calcium carbonate

Calcium-based phosphate binders, such as calcium carbonate, directly decrease phosphate levels by creating insoluble calcium–phosphate complexes which gets eliminated in the feces.

Lanthanum carbonate

Non-calcium-based phosphate binders, including lanthanum carbonate, form insoluble complexes with phosphates in food, thereby reducing the amount of phosphate in the body.

Sevelamer carbonate

Sevelamer is an insoluble polymeric amine, which is protonated once in the intestines and this allows it to bind dietary phosphate. Phosphates are eliminated along with sevelamer, leading to a decrease in the body's phosphate levels.

== Medical use ==
For people with chronic kidney failure, controlling serum phosphate is important because it is associated with bone pathology and regulated together with serum calcium by the parathyroid hormone (PTH).

== Adverse effects ==
Calcium carbonate

- GI effects (nausea, vomiting, constipation)
- Risk of cardiovascular calcification
- Risk of hypercalcemia

Lanthanum carbonate

- GI obstruction
- Bile duct obstruction
- Hepatic impairment
- No hypercalcemia risk

Sevelamer carbonate

- GI effects (nausea, vomiting, constipation, flatulence)
- No hypercalcemia risk

== Choice of agent ==
There have been limited trials comparing phosphate binders to placebo in the treatment of hyperphosphatemia in people with chronic kidney disease. When compared with people receiving calcium-based binders, people taking sevelamer have a reduced all-cause mortality.

=== Types ===
Summary of Common Oral Phosphate Binders
Phosphate Binder	Brands	Advantages	Disadvantages
Aluminum salts	Alucaps	Calcium free	Risk of aluminum toxicity
	Basaljel	High binder efficiency regardless of pH	Requires frequent monitoring-extra cost
		Cheap	
		Moderate tablet burden	
Calcium carbonate	Calcichew	Aluminum free	Calcium containing-potential risk of hypercalcemia and ectopic calcification
	Titralac	Moderate binding efficacy	Parathyroid hormone oversuppression
		Relatively low cost	Gastrointestinal side effects
		Moderate tablet burden	Efficacy pH dependent
		Chewable	
Calcium acetate	Lenal Ace	Aluminum free	Calcium containing-potential risk of hypercalcemia and ectopic calcification
	PhosLo	Higher efficacy than calcichew/sevelamer	Parathyroid hormone oversuppression
		Moderately cheap	Gastrointestinal side effects
		Lower calcium load than calcium carbonate	Large tablets & capsules, nonchewable formulation
Sevelamer hydrochloride/Sevelamer carbonate	Renagel	Aluminium and calcium free	Relatively costly
	Renvela	No gastrointestinal absorption	High pill burden
		Moderate efficacy	Large tablets, nonchewable formulation
		Reduces total and low-density lipoprotein cholesterol	Gastrointestinal side effects
			Binds fat-soluble vitamins
Lanthanum carbonate	Fosrenol	Aluminum and calcium free	Relatively costly
		Minimal gastrointestinal absorption	Gastrointestinal side effects
		High efficacy across full pH range	Larger tablet size may cause choking if not chewed well
		Chewable formulation	
		Palatable	
		Low tablet burden	
Ferric Citrate	Auryxia	Iron based	Very costly
			Tablets can be toxic to young children
			Stool discoloration - may turn them black, obscuring intestinal bleeding

- Calcium acetate/magnesium carbonate
