= Maxacalcitol =

Chemical compound

Clinical data
- Trade names: Oxarol
- Other names: 22-Oxacalcitriol; OCT
- Routes of administration: IV or topical

Legal status
- Legal status: In general: ℞ (Prescription only)

Identifiers
- IUPAC name: (1R,3S,5Z)-5-[(2E)-2-[(1S,3aS,7aS)-1-[(1S)-1-(3-Hydroxy-3-methylbutoxy)ethyl]-7a-methyl-2,3,3a,5,6,7-hexahydro-1H-inden-4-ylidene]ethylidene]-4-methylidenecyclohexane-1,3-diol
- CAS Number: 103909-75-7
- PubChem CID: 6398761
- IUPHAR/BPS: 2784
- DrugBank: DB06272
- ChemSpider: 4911262
- UNII: N2UJM5NBF6
- ChEBI: CHEBI:31801
- ChEMBL: ChEMBL333950
- CompTox Dashboard (EPA): DTXSID4048648
- ECHA InfoCard: 100.212.050

Chemical and physical data
- Formula: C_{26}H_{42}O_{4}
- Molar mass: 418.618 g·mol^{−1}
- 3D model (JSmol): Interactive image
- SMILES: C[C@@H]([C@H]1CC[C@@H]\2[C@@]1(CCC/C2=C\C=C/3\C[C@H](C[C@@H](C3=C)O)O)C)OCCC(C)(C)O
- InChI: InChI=1S/C26H42O4/c1-17-20(15-21(27)16-24(17)28)9-8-19-7-6-12-26(5)22(10-11-23(19)26)18(2)30-14-13-25(3,4)29/h8-9,18,21-24,27-29H,1,6-7,10-16H2,2-5H3/b19-8+,20-9-/t18-,21+,22+,23-,24-,26+/m0/s1; Key:DTXXSJZBSTYZKE-ZDQKKZTESA-N

Maxacalcitol (trade name Oxarol) is a vitamin D_{3} analog and vitamin D receptor activator (VDRA). As a pharmaceutical drug, it is used as an injection to treat secondary hyperparathyroidism resulting from hemodialysis and as a topical ointment for psoriasis.

It was approved for use in Japan in 2010 and in Taiwan in 2018.
