= KMT2A rearrangements =

Type of chromosomal translocation

KMT2A rearrangements are chromosomal translocations involving the KMT2A gene that create fusion proteins and occur in certain blood cancers such as acute lymphoblastic leukemia (ALL) and acute myeloid leukemia (AML). They also occur less commonly in mixed-phenotype acute leukemia as well as myeloid sarcomas, soft tissue sarcomas, and thymomas.

KMT2A fusion proteins can inhibit cellular differentiation and promote leukemogenesis.

== Leukemia ==
The effect of KMT2A rearrangements on prognosis varies by leukemia type, age, and protein fusion partner. In AML, some fusions carry high risk whereas others have outcomes similar to other AML subtypes. Cancers harboring KMT2A fusions can be targeted with drugs such as menin inhibitors. Revumenib is an approved memin inhibitor drug used to treat relapsed or refractory acute leukemia.

== Other cancers ==
KMT2A rearrangements have been found in myeloid sarcoma (a solid collection of leukemic cells) as KMT2A-MLLT3 fusions. KMT2A rearrangements have been detected in 0.2% of soft tissue sarcomas, most often as YAP1 and less commonly as VIM fusions. Finally KMT2A–MAML2 gene fusions have also been identified in aggressive subtypes of thymoma.

== Mechanism of action ==
KMT2A fusion proteins acquire activities from the fused partner protein. These capacities include either the ability to recruit DOT1L (a histone H3 lysine 79 methyltransferase) or components of the super elongation complex. These added capacities allow sustained transcription of specific genes that promote cell survival and block cellular differentiation.

Menin interacts both with wild-type KMT2A, and KMT2A fusion proteins and menin inhibitors block the binding of menin to both wild-type KMT2A and KMT2A fusion proteins.
