= Multiple endocrine neoplasia =

Group of genetic conditions

- Other names: MEN
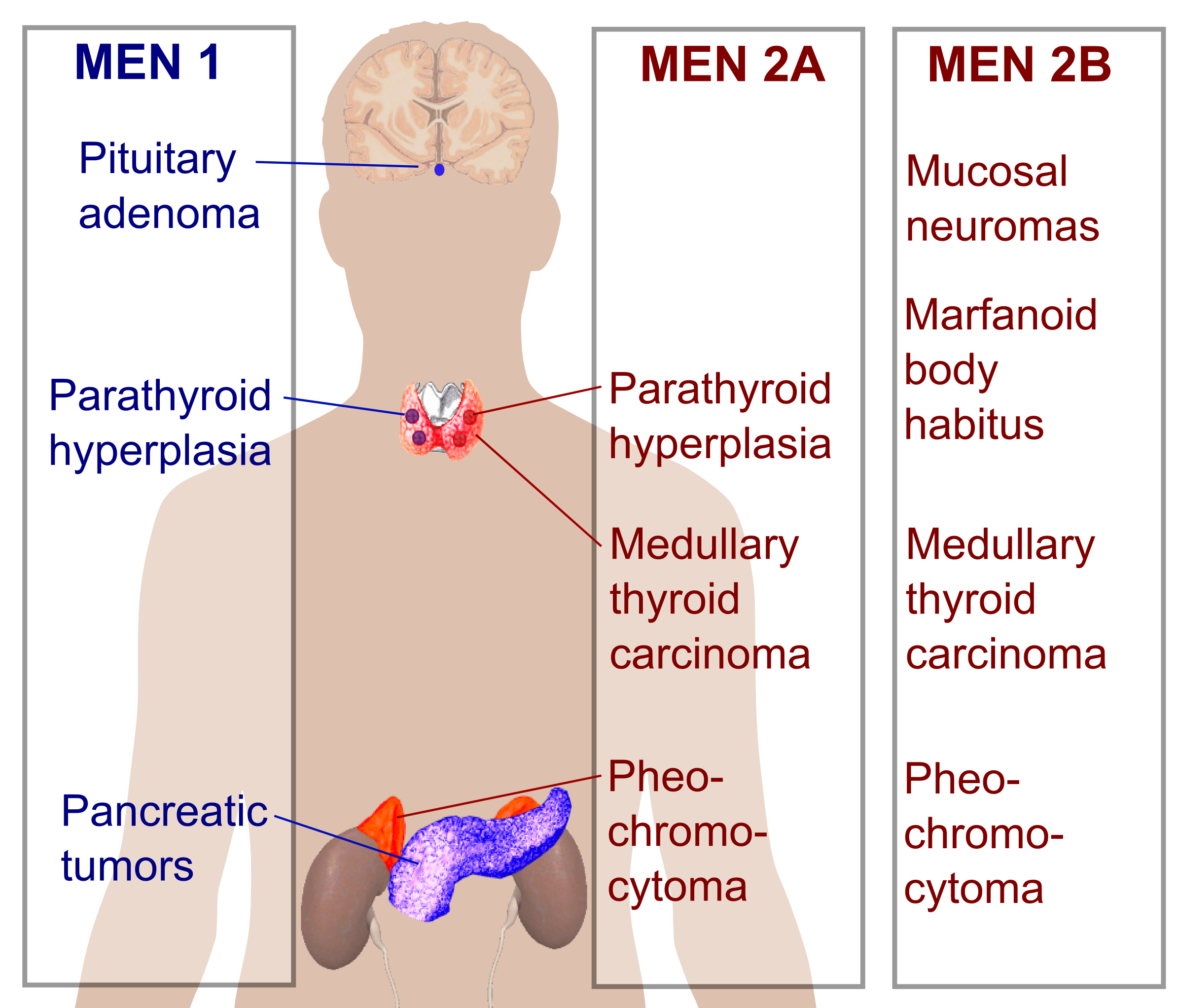
- Specialty: Endocrinology
- Causes: RET receptor defect Which is growth signal receptor, its type of self-sufficiency of growth signals

Multiple endocrine neoplasia (abbreviated MEN) is a condition which encompasses several distinct syndromes featuring tumors of endocrine glands, each with its own characteristic pattern. In some cases, the tumors are malignant, in others, benign. Benign or malignant tumors of nonendocrine tissues occur as components of some of these tumor syndromes.

MEN syndromes are inherited as autosomal dominant disorders.

== Presentation ==
=== Related conditions ===
Although not officially categorized as multiple endocrine neoplasia syndromes, Von Hippel–Lindau disease and Carney complex are two other autosomal dominant endocrine tumor syndromes with features that overlap the clinical features of the MEN syndromes. Although not transmitted in the germline, McCune–Albright syndrome is a genetic disorder characterized by endocrine neoplastic features involving endocrine glands that overlap with those involved in MEN1 or MEN2.

== Comparison ==
Percentages in the table below refer to the percentage of people with the MEN type who develop the neoplasia type.

| Feature | MEN 1 | MEN 2 | | |
| Feature | MEN 1 | MEN 2A | MEN 2B | FMTC |
|---|---|---|---|---|
| Eponym | Wermer syndrome | Sipple syndrome | Wagenmann–Froboese syndrome | (none) |
| OMIM | 131100 | 171400 | 162300 | 155240 |
| Pancreatic tumors | gastrinoma (50%), insulinoma (20%), VIPoma, glucagonoma, PPoma | – | – | – |
| Pituitary adenoma | 66% | – | – | – |
| Angiofibroma | 64%* | – | – | – |
| Lipoma | 17%* | – | – | – |
| Parathyroid hyperplasia | 90% | 50% | – | – |
| Medullary thyroid carcinoma | – | 100% | 85% | 100% |
| Pheochromocytoma | – | >33% | 50% | – |
| Marfanoid body habitus | – | – | 80% | – |
| Mucosal neuroma | – | – | 100% | – |
| Gene(s) | MEN1 ( 613733) | RET ( 164761) | RET ( 164761) | RET ( 164761), NTRK1 ( 191315) |
| Approx. prevalence | 1 in 35,000 (1 in 20,000 to 1 in 40,000) | 1 in 40,000 | 1 in 1,000,000 (1 in 600,000 to 1 in 4,000,000) | |
| Initial description (year) | 1954 | 1961 | 1965 | |

*– of patients with MEN1 and gastrinoma

FMTC = familial medullary thyroid cancer

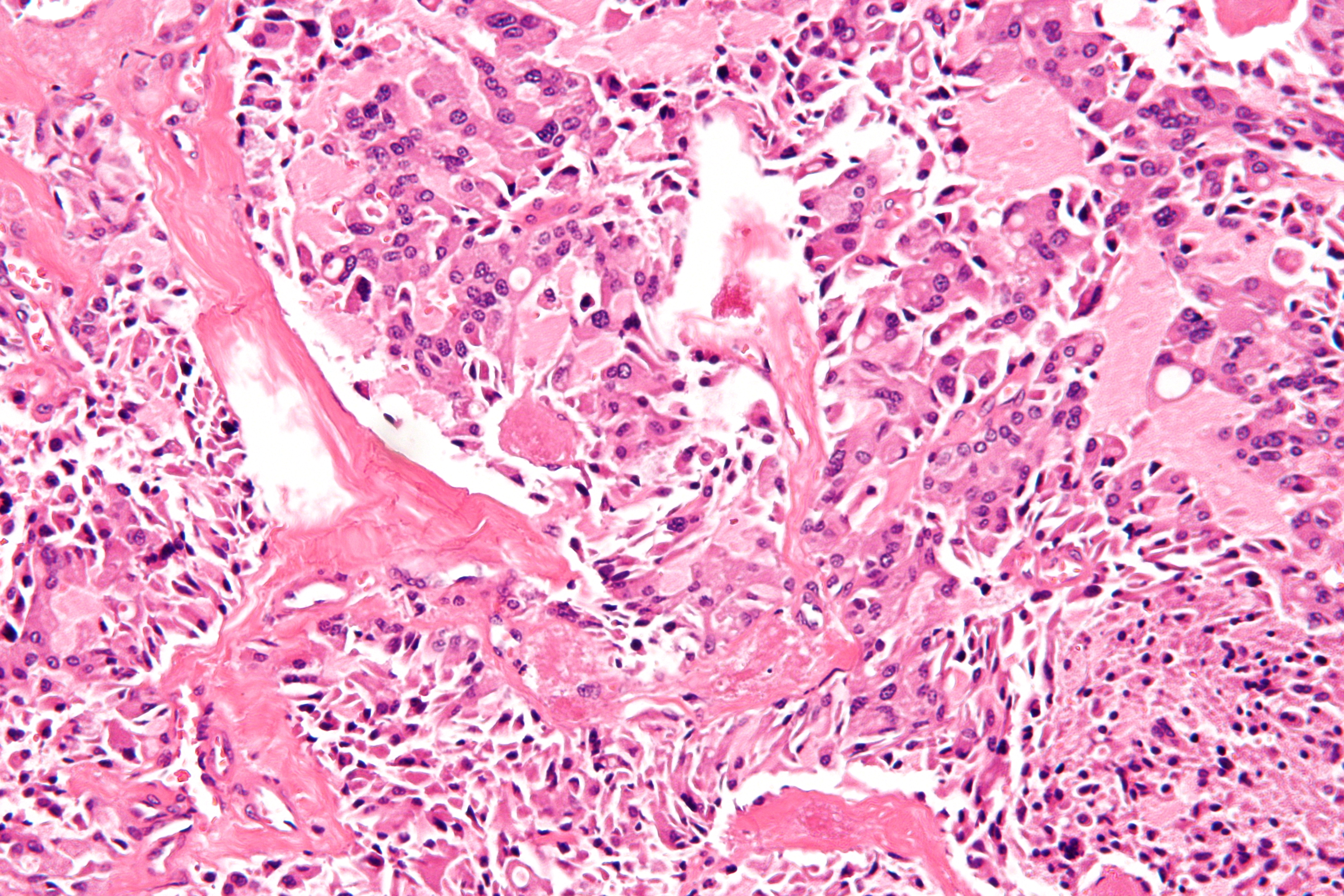
Micrograph of a medullary thyroid carcinoma, as may be seen in MEN 2A and MEN 2B. H&E stain

MEN 2B is sometimes known as MEN 3 and the designation varies by institution (cf. www.ClinicalReview.com). Although a variety of additional eponyms have been proposed for MEN2B (e.g. Williams-Pollock syndrome, Gorlin-Vickers syndrome, and Wagenmann–Froboese syndrome), none ever gained sufficient traction to merit continued use and, indeed, are all but abandoned in the medical literature. Another early report was Schimke et al. in 1968.

OMIM also includes a fourth form of multiple endocrine neoplasia ("MEN4"), associated with CDKN1B. The presentation is believed to overlap that of MEN1 and MEN2.

== Multiple Endocrine Neoplasia Type 1 (MEN1) ==
=== The MEN1 gene ===
The MEN1 gene consists of ten exons, spanning about 10 kb, and encodes a 610 amino acid protein named menin. The first exon and the last part of exon 10 are not translated. The main transcript of 2.8 kb has been described in a large variety of human tissues (pancreas, thymus, adrenal glands, thyroid, testis, leukocytes, heart, brain, lung, muscle, small intestine, liver, and kidney); an additional transcript of approximately 4 kb has been detected in pancreas and thymus, suggesting tissue-specific alternative splicing.

=== The Menin Protein ===
Menin is a 610 amino acid (67Kda) nuclear protein, highly conserved from mouse (98%), rat (97%) and, more distantly, zebrafish (75%) and Drosophila (47%) (47–51). Human and mouse MEN1 amino acid sequences share 95.8% identity and 98.4% similarity. Analysis of menin amino acid sequence did not reveal homologies to any other known human or mammalian protein, sequence motif, or signal peptide. The absence of significant homology to any other protein complicates efforts to elucidate the functions of menin.

=== Pathophysiology ===
MEN1 follows Knudson's “two-hit” model for tumor suppressor gene carcinogenesis (30). The first hit is a heterozygous MEN1 germline mutation, inherited from one parent (familial cases) or developed in an early embryonic stage (sporadic cases) and present in all cells at birth. The second hit is a MEN1 somatic mutation, usually a large deletion, that occurs in the predisposed endocrine cell as loss of the remaining wild-type allele and gives cells the survival advantage needed for tumor development.

=== Mnemonic ===
A useful mnemonic to remember the associated neoplasias is below:

MEN I (3 Ps) – Pituitary, Parathyroid, Pancreatic
MEN IIa (2Ps, 1M) – Pheochromocytoma, Parathyroid, Medullary Thyroid Ca
MEN IIb (1P, 2Ms) – Pheochromocytoma, Medullary Thyroid Ca, Marfanoid habitus/mucosal neuroma

=== MEN1 mutations in multiple endocrine neoplasia patients and clinical genetics ===
MEN1 gene mutations can be identified in 70–95% of MEN1 patients and in about 20% of familial isolated hyperparathyroidism cases. Almost all patients are heterozygous for mutations. One affected family has been identified with individuals both homozygous and heterozygous for MEN1 mutations. In this family, there was no difference in disease history between the homozygous and heterozygous mutation carriers.

50% of patients develop signs and symptoms by 20 years of age and more than 95% have symptoms by 40 years of age. There is significant intra- and inter-familial variability in the age of onset, the severity of disease, and tumor types. Despite numerous studies, no genotype-phenotype correlations have been established, suggesting that unknown genetic and environmental modifiers are involved in the expression of the MEN1 phenotype.

=== Manifestations ===
Multiple Endocrine Neoplasia type 1 (MEN1) is a rare hereditary endocrine cancer syndrome characterized primarily by tumors of the parathyroid glands (95% of cases), endocrine gastroenteropancreatic (GEP) tract (30–80% of cases), and anterior pituitary (15–90% of cases). Other endocrine and non-endocrine neoplasms including adrenocortical and thyroid tumors, visceral and cutaneous lipomas, meningiomas, facial angiofibromas and collagenomas, and thymic, gastric, and bronchial carcinoids also occur. The phenotype of MEN1 is broad, and over 20 different combinations of endocrine and non-endocrine manifestations have been described. MEN1 should be suspected in patients with an endocrinopathy of two of the three characteristic affected organs, or with an endocrinopathy of one of these organs plus a first-degree relative affected by MEN1 syndrome.

MEN1 patients usually have a family history of MEN1. Inheritance is autosomal dominant; any affected parent has a 50% chance to transmit the disease to his or her progeny. MEN1 gene mutations can be identified in 70–95% of MEN1 patients.

Many endocrine tumors in MEN1 are benign and cause symptoms by overproduction of hormones or local mass effects, while other MEN1 tumors are associated with an elevated risk for malignancy. About one-third of patients affected with MEN1 will die early from MEN1-related cancer or associated malignancy. Entero-pancreatic gastrinomas and thymic and bronchial carcinoids are the leading cause of morbidity and mortality. Consequently, the average age of death in untreated individuals with MEN1 is significantly lower (55.4 years for men and 46.8 years for women) than that of the general population.

=== Recommended cancer surveillance ===
A recommend surveillance program for Multiple Endocrine Neoplasia Type 1 has been suggested by the International Guidelines for Diagnosis and Therapy of MEN syndromes group.

== History ==
In 1903 Erdheim described the case of an acromegalic patient with a pituitary adenoma and three enlarged parathyroid glands.

In 1953 Underdahl et al. reported a case series of 8 patients with a syndrome of pituitary, parathyroid, and pancreatic islet adenomas.

In 1954 Wermer noted that this syndrome was transmitted as a dominant trait.

In 1959 Hazard et al. described medullary (solid) thyroid carcinoma.

In 1961 Sipple described a combination of a pheochromocytoma, medullary thyroid carcinoma and parathyroid adenoma.

In 1966 Williams et al. described the combination of mucosal neuromas, pheochromocytoma and medullary thyroid carcinoma.

In 1968 Steiner et al. introduced the term "multiple endocrine neoplasias" (MEN) to describe disorders featuring combinations of endocrine tumors and proposed the terms 'Wermer syndrome' for MEN 1 and 'Sipple syndrome' for MEN 2.

In 1974 Sizemore et al. showed that the MEN 2 category included two groups of patients with MTC and pheochromocytoma: one with parathyroid disease and a normal appearance (MEN 2A) and the other without parathyroid disease but with mucosal neuromas and mesodermal abnormalities (MEN 2B).

In 1988 the MEN1 locus was assigned to Chromosome 11 (11q13).

In 1993 mutations in the RET oncogene were shown to be the cause of MEN 2A by Lois Mulligan, working in the laboratory of Bruce Ponder in Cambridge.

In 1998 the MEN1 gene was cloned.

== Terminology ==
The older names, "multiple endocrine adenomas" and "multiple endocrine adenomatosis" (MEA), have been replaced by the current terminology.

The term multiple endocrine neoplasias are used when two or more endocrine tumor types, known to occur as a part of one of the defined MEN syndromes, occurs in a single patient and there is evidence for either a causative mutation or hereditary transmission. The presence of two or more tumor types in a single patient does not automatically designate that individual as having MEN because there is a small statistical chance that the development of two "sporadic" tumors that occur in one of the MEN syndromes could occur by chance.

The term "multiple endocrine neoplasia" was introduced in 1968, but descriptions of the condition date back to 1903.

== See also ==
- Multiple endocrine neoplasia type 1
- Multiple endocrine neoplasia type 2a
- Multiple endocrine neoplasia type 2b
- Multiple endocrine neoplasia type 4
