= Bleximenib =

Clinical data
- Other names: JNJ-6617; JNJ-75276617

Legal status
- Legal status: investigational

Identifiers
- IUPAC name: N-ethyl-5-fluoro-2-[[5-[2-[(3R)-6-[2-methoxyethyl(methyl)amino]-2-methylhexan-3-yl]-2,7-diazaspiro[3.4]octan-7-yl]-1,2,4-triazin-6-yl]oxy]-N-propan-2-ylbenzamide
- CAS Number: 2654081-35-1
- PubChem CID: 156498110
- IUPHAR/BPS: 12866
- DrugBank: DB19328
- ChemSpider: 129458099
- UNII: DCN5WEN78T
- KEGG: D13254
- ChEBI: CHEBI:759213
- ChEMBL: ChEMBL5314509

Chemical and physical data
- Formula: C_{32}H_{50}FN_{7}O_{3}
- Molar mass: 599.796 g·mol^{−1}
- 3D model (JSmol): Interactive image
- SMILES: CCN(C(C)C)C(=O)C1=C(C=CC(=C1)F)OC2=C(N=CN=N2)N3CCC4(C3)CN(C4)[C@H](CCCN(C)CCOC)C(C)C
- InChI: InChI=InChI=1S/C32H50FN7O3/c1-8-40(24(4)5)31(41)26-18-25(33)11-12-28(26)43-30-29(34-22-35-36-30)38-15-13-32(19-38)20-39(21-32)27(23(2)3)10-9-14-37(6)16-17-42-7/h11-12,18,22-24,27H,8-10,13-17,19-21H2,1-7H3/t27-/m1/s1; Key:PDUGAXSIWNMIBQ-HHHXNRCGSA-N

Bleximenib is an investigational new drug that is being evaluated by Janssen Research & Development for the treatment of acute myeloid leukaemia (AML). It is a menin inhibitor preventing its interaction with KMT2A.

== Pharmacology ==
Bleximenib is a selective inhibitor of menin preventing its interaction with the lysine methyltransferase KMT2A. The menin/KMT2A complex regulates gene expression in leukemia cells which keeps them in an immature state that is continually dividing.

== Clinical trials ==
Bleximenib is in phase 3 clinical trials for AML.
