= Hypertrichosis cubiti =

- Other names: hairy elbow syndrome
- Specialty: Dermatology

Hypertrichosis cubiti (also known as "hairy elbow syndrome") is a cutaneous condition characterized by multiple terminal hairs on both elbows in children.

== Signs and symptoms ==
Hypertrichosis cubiti is characterized by an unusually high concentration of long hairs that are concentrated mostly in the elbow area on the extensor surfaces of the upper extremities. Hypertrichosis is not always visible at birth; it typically manifests in early infancy, peaks between the ages of 5 and 6, then gradually declines and eventually goes away during puberty.

== Causes ==
Several inheritance patterns with varying penetrance and expressivity have been proposed, such as a familial pattern with either an autosomal dominant or autosomal recessive inheritance. Primary nevoid hypertrichosis and somatic hypertrichosis mosaicism are two other possibilities. There have been some speculative connections made to disorders including the Floating-Harbor syndrome, Wiedemann-Steiner syndrome, and Weill-Marchesani syndrome.

== Treatment ==
For children with sporadic hypertrichosis cubiti, parents should be reassured and given guidance on hair removal or bleaching. Care should be used while discussing hair removal methods in order to reduce discomfort and expense.

== See also ==
- Hook nail
- List of cutaneous conditions
