= Enzomenib =

Clinical data
- Other names: DSP-5336

Identifiers
- IUPAC name: 5-fluoro-2-[4-[7-[(1S,3S,4R)-5-methylidene-2-azabicyclo[2.2.2]octane-3-carbonyl]-2,7-diazaspiro[3.5]nonan-2-yl]pyrimidin-5-yl]oxy-N,N-di(propan-2-yl)benzamide
- CAS Number: 2412555-70-3
- PubChem CID: 146430058
- DrugBank: DB18514
- ChemSpider: 129534736
- UNII: VW83Y2JLZ5
- KEGG: D13193
- ChEMBL: ChEMBL5314915

Chemical and physical data
- Formula: C_{33}H_{43}FN_{6}O_{3}
- Molar mass: 590.744 g·mol^{−1}
- 3D model (JSmol): Interactive image
- SMILES: CC(C)N(C(C)C)C(=O)C1=C(C=CC(=C1)F)OC2=CN=CN=C2N3CC4(C3)CCN(CC4)C(=O)[C@@H]5[C@@H]6CC[C@H](N5)CC6=C
- InChI: InChI=InChI=1S/C33H43FN6O3/c1-20(2)40(21(3)4)31(41)26-15-23(34)6-9-27(26)43-28-16-35-19-36-30(28)39-17-33(18-39)10-12-38(13-11-33)32(42)29-25-8-7-24(37-29)14-22(25)5/h6,9,15-16,19-21,24-25,29,37H,5,7-8,10-14,17-18H2,1-4H3/t24-,25+,29-/m0/s1; Key:JQHJEDMMWUIYCE-FVVBACEJSA-N

Enzomenib is an investigational new drug that is being evaluated for the treatment of acute leukemia. It is a small molecule inhibitor that targets the interaction between menin and mixed-lineage leukemia (MLL) proteins. Enzomenib targets tumors with KMT2A (MLL) rearrangements or NPM1 mutations.

The U.S. Food and Drug Administration (FDA) has granted both Fast Track and Orphan Drug designations to Enzomenib.
