= Multiple endocrine neoplasia type 4 =

Human disease

Multiple endocrine neoplasia type 4 is a rare sub-type of Multiple endocrine neoplasia. The condition is commonly referred to as "MEN4".

According to the National Library of Medicine, "in MEN4, there is a mutation in the cyclin-dependent kinase inhibitor 1B gene (CDKN1B)."

The clinical manifestations of MEN type 4 include hyperparathyroidism, pituitary adenomas, and tumors.

While it was formerly called "MENX", the condition was renamed "MEN4" at the 11th International Workshop on MENs in Delphi, Greece.
