= Endocrine gland neoplasm =

Tumor in the glands of the endocrine system

- Specialty: Oncology, endocrinology

An endocrine gland neoplasm is a neoplasm affecting one or more glands of the endocrine system.Examples include:

- Adrenal tumor
- Pituitary adenoma

The most common form is thyroid cancer. Conditions such as pancreatic cancer or ovarian cancer can be considered endocrine tumors, or classified under other systems. Pinealoma is often grouped with brain tumors because of its location.

== See also ==
- Multiple endocrine neoplasia
