= Revumenib =

Chemical compound

Clinical data
- Pronunciation: /rɪˈvuːmɛnɪb/ rih-VOO-meh-nib
- Trade names: Revuforj
- Other names: SNDX-5613
- AHFS/Drugs.com: Monograph
- MedlinePlus: a624077
- License data: US DailyMed: Revumenib
- Routes of administration: By mouth
- Drug class: Antineoplastic; menin inhibitor
- ATC code: L01XX87 (WHO)

Legal status
- Legal status: US: ℞-only

Identifiers
- IUPAC name: N-ethyl-2-[4-[7-[[4-(ethylsulfonylamino)cyclohexyl]methyl]-2,7-diazaspiro[3.5]nonan-2-yl]pyrimidin-5-yl]oxy-5-fluoro-N-propan-2-ylbenzamide
- CAS Number: 2169919-21-3; 2169919-22-4
- PubChem CID: 132212657
- DrugBank: DB18515; DBSALT003460
- ChemSpider: 95502909
- UNII: LZ0M43NNF2; 75HI05N8HS
- KEGG: D12728; D12729
- ChEMBL: ChEMBL4650827; ChEMBL4650278
- PDB ligand: OQ4 (PDBe, RCSB PDB)

Chemical and physical data
- Formula: C_{32}H_{47}FN_{6}O_{4}S
- Molar mass: 630.82 g·mol^{−1}
- 3D model (JSmol): Interactive image
- SMILES: CCN(C(C)C)C(=O)C1=C(C=CC(=C1)F)OC2=CN=CN=C2N3CC4(C3)CCN(CC4)CC5CCC(CC5)NS(=O)(=O)CC
- InChI: InChI=InChI=1S/C32H47FN6O4S/c1-5-39(23(3)4)31(40)27-17-25(33)9-12-28(27)43-29-18-34-22-35-30(29)38-20-32(21-38)13-15-37(16-14-32)19-24-7-10-26(11-8-24)36-44(41,42)6-2/h9,12,17-18,22-24,26,36H,5-8,10-11,13-16,19-21H2,1-4H3; Key:FRVSRBKUQZKTOW-UHFFFAOYSA-N; Key:AXNUWYROYVRYIM-OQIJCFCCSA-N

Revumenib, sold under the brand name Revuforj, is an anti-cancer medication used for the treatment of acute leukemias harboring lysine methyltransferase 2A gene (KMT2A) rearrangements. It is designed to disrupt the interaction between menin and KMT2A (also known as MLL), which plays a role in the pathogenesis of these leukemias. It is taken by mouth.

The most common adverse reactions include hemorrhage, nausea, increased phosphate, musculoskeletal pain, infection, increased aspartate aminotransferase, febrile neutropenia, increased alanine aminotransferase, increased intact parathyroid hormone, bacterial infection, diarrhea, differentiation syndrome, electrocardiogram QT prolonged, decreased phosphate, increased triglycerides, decreased potassium, decreased appetite, constipation, edema, viral infection, fatigue, and increased alkaline phosphatase.

Revumenib was approved for medical use in the United States in November 2024. The US Food and Drug Administration (FDA) considers it to be a first-in-class medication.

== Medical uses ==
Revumenib is indicated for the treatment of relapsed or refractory acute leukemia with a lysine methyltransferase 2A gene (KMT2A) translocation.

In October 2025, the indication for revumenib was expanded for the treatment of relapsed or refractory acute myeloid leukemia with a susceptible nucleophosmin 1 (NPM1) mutation in people who have no satisfactory alternative treatment options.

== Adverse effects ==
The US prescribing information includes warnings and precautions for differentiation syndrome, QTc interval prolongation, Torsades de Pointes, and embryo-fetal toxicity.

The most common adverse reactions include hemorrhage, nausea, increased phosphate, musculoskeletal pain, infection, increased aspartate aminotransferase, febrile neutropenia, increased alanine aminotransferase, increased intact parathyroid hormone, bacterial infection, diarrhea, differentiation syndrome, electrocardiogram QT prolonged, decreased phosphate, increased triglycerides, decreased potassium, decreased appetite, constipation, edema, viral infection, fatigue, and increased alkaline phosphatase.

== History ==
Efficacy was evaluated in a single-arm cohort of an open-label, multicenter trial (SNDX-5613-0700, NCT04065399; AUGMENT-101) in 104 adult and pediatric participants (at least 30 days old) with relapsed or refractory (R/R) acute leukemia with a lysine methyltransferase 2A gene translocation. Participants with an 11q23 partial tandem duplication were excluded. Revumenib was administered until disease progression, unacceptable toxicity, failure to achieve morphological leukemia-free state by four cycles of treatment, or hematopoietic stem cell transplantation.

The US Food and Drug Administration (FDA) granted the application for revumenib priority review, breakthrough therapy, and orphan drug designations.

Efficacy was evaluated in a single-arm cohort of an open-label, multi-center trial (SNDX-5613-0700, NCT04065399; AUGMENT-101). A susceptible mutation was confirmed in enrolled participants using next generation sequencing or polymerase chain reaction of the last exon of NPM1.

== Society and culture ==
=== Legal status ===
Revumenib was approved for medical use in the United States in November 2024.

=== Names ===
Revumenib is the international nonproprietary name.

It is sold under the brand name Revuforj.
