= TASP1 =

Protein-coding gene in the species Homo sapiens

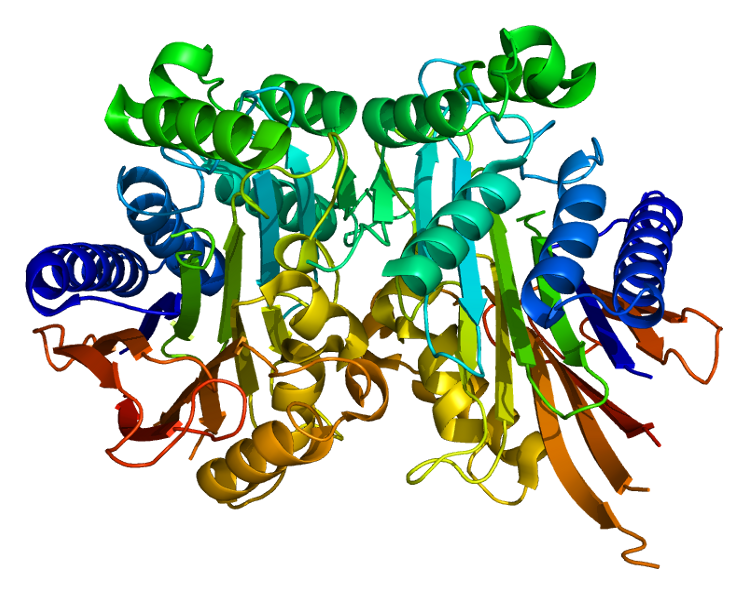

Identifiers
- Aliases: TASP1, C20orf13, dJ585I14.2, taspase 1, SULEHS
- External IDs: OMIM: 608270; MGI: 1923062; GeneCards: TASP1
Available structures
PDB	Ortholog search: PDBe RCSB
PDB	List of PDB id codes 2A8I, 2A8J, 2A8L, 2A8M

Gene location (Human)
Chr.	Chromosome 20 (human)
Band	20p12.1	Start	13,389,392 bp
Band	20p12.1	End	13,638,932 bp

Gene location (Mouse)
Chr.	Chromosome 2 (mouse)
Band	2|2 F3	Start	139,675,400 bp
Band	2|2 F3	End	139,908,725 bp
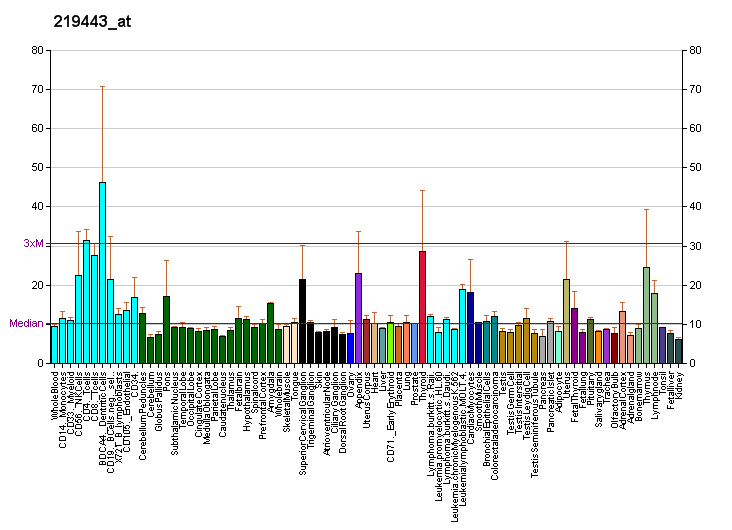
RNA expression pattern
Bgee	Human / Mouse (ortholog); Top expressed in: popliteal artery; tibial arteries; testicle; Achilles tendon; secondary oocyte; epithelium of nasopharynx; Descending thoracic aorta; tibia; ascending aorta; bronchial epithelial cell / Top expressed in: spermatid; Region I of hippocampus proper; pineal gland; barrel cortex; spermatocyte; lacrimal gland; dentate gyrus of hippocampal formation granule cell; lens; right kidney; proximal tubule; More reference expression data
BioGPS	More reference expression data
Gene ontology
Molecular function	peptidase activity; hydrolase activity; threonine-type endopeptidase activity; identical protein binding
Cellular component	cytoplasm
Biological process	positive regulation of transcription, DNA-templated; proteolysis; protein maturation
Sources:Amigo / QuickGO
Orthologs
Databases	NCBI: entry; OMA: entry
Species	Human	Mouse
Entrez	55617	75812
Ensembl	ENSG00000089123	ENSMUSG00000039033
UniProt	Q9H6P5	Q8R1G1
RefSeq (mRNA)	NM_017714; NM_001323602; NM_001323603; NM_001323604	NM_001159640; NM_001159641; NM_001289611; NM_175225
RefSeq (protein)	NP_001310531; NP_001310532; NP_001310533; NP_060184	NP_001153112; NP_001153113; NP_001276540; NP_780434
Location (UCSC)	Chr 20: 13.39 – 13.64 Mb	Chr 2: 139.68 – 139.91 Mb
PubMed search
- Wikidata
View/Edit Human	View/Edit Mouse

Threonine aspartase 1 is an enzyme that in humans is encoded by the TASP1 gene.

== Function ==
This gene encodes an endopeptidase that cleaves specific substrates following aspartate residues. The encoded protein undergoes posttranslational autoproteolytic processing to generate alpha and beta subunits, which reassemble into the active alpha2-beta2 heterotetramer. It is required to cleave MLL, a protein required for the maintenance of HOX gene expression, and TFIIA, a basal transcription factor. Cleavage of TFIIA has been found to drive spermatogenesis.

Alternatively spliced transcript variants have been described, but their biological validity has not been determined.

== Clinical significance ==
Taspase1 is overexpressed in primary human cancers and functions as a non-oncogene addiction protease that coordinates cancer cell proliferation and apoptosis. Therefore, Taspase1 may serve as a novel anti-cancer therapeutic target. A mutation of the TASP1 gene causes Suleiman-El-Hattab syndrome, a genetic disorder recently described in 2018.
