= Multiple endocrine neoplasia type 2B =

Multiple endocrine neoplasia type 2b
- Other names: MEN 2B, Mucosal neuromata with endocrine tumors, Multiple endocrine neoplasia type 3 ,Wagenmann–Froboese syndrome
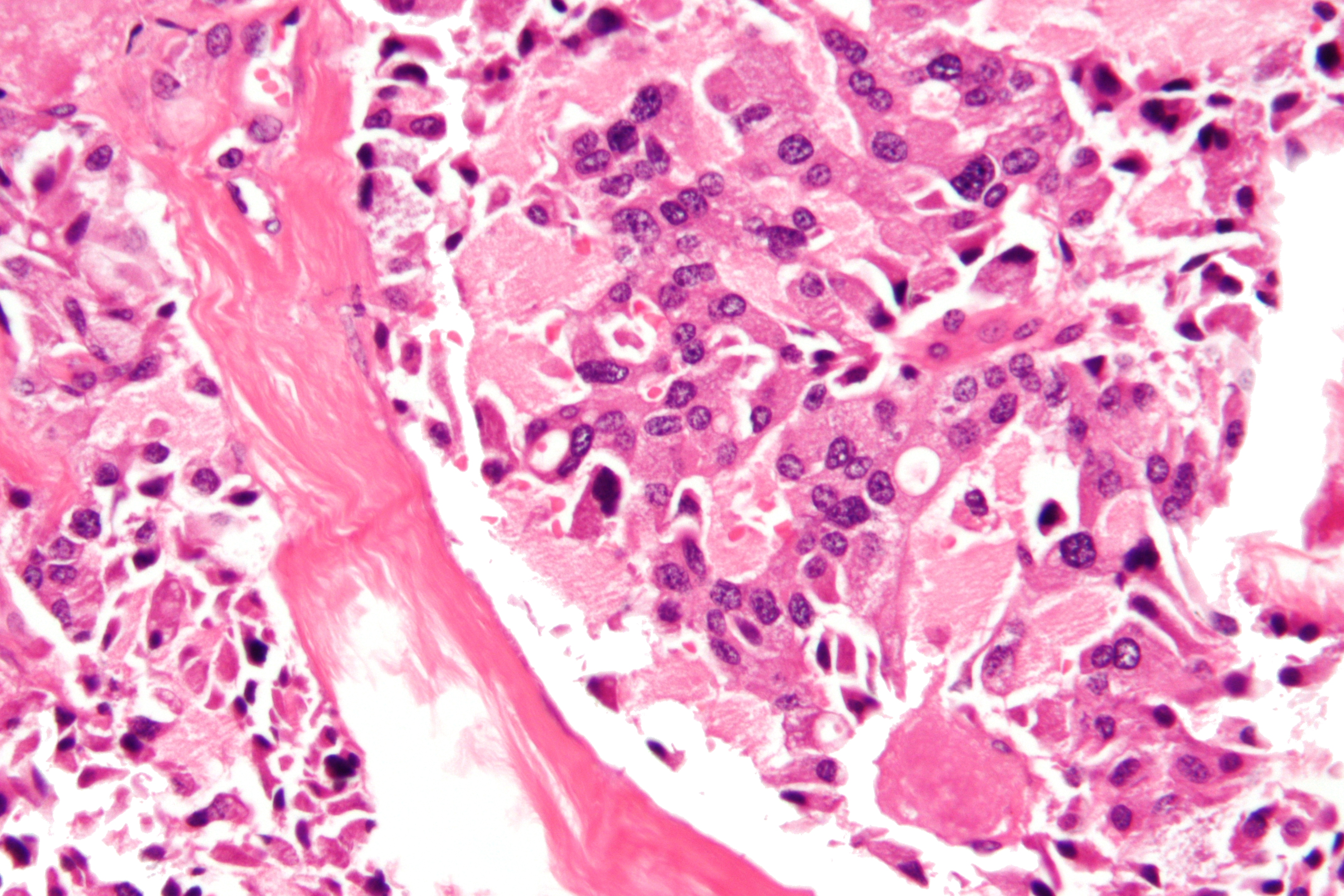
- Micrograph of medullary thyroid carcinoma, as may be seen in MEN 2b. H&E stain.
- Specialty: Endocrinology

Multiple endocrine neoplasia type 2B (MEN 2B) is a genetic disease that causes multiple tumors on the mouth, eyes, and endocrine glands. It is the most severe type of multiple endocrine neoplasia, differentiated by the presence of benign oral and submucosal tumors in addition to endocrine malignancies. It was first described by Wagenmann in 1922, and was first recognized as a syndrome in 1965–1966 by E.D. Williams and D.J. Pollock. It is caused by the pathogenic variant p.Met918Thr in the RET gene. This variant can cause medullary thyroid cancer and pheochromocytoma. Presentation can include a Marfanoid body, enlarged lips, and ganglioneuromas.

MEN 2B typically manifests before a child is 10 years old. Affected individuals tend to be tall and lanky, with an elongated face and protruding, blubbery lips. Benign tumors (neoplasms) develop in the mouth, eyes, and submucosa of almost all organs in the first decade of life. Medullary thyroid cancer almost always occurs, sometimes in infancy. It is often aggressive. Cancer of the adrenal glands (pheochromocytoma) occurs in 50% of cases.

A variety of eponyms have been proposed for MEN 2B, such as Williams-Pollock syndrome, Gorlin-Vickers syndrome, and Wagenmann-Froboese syndrome. However, none ever gained sufficient traction to merit continued use, and they are no longer used in the medical literature.

The prevalence of MEN2B is not well established, but has been derived from other epidemiological considerations as 1 in 600,000 to 1 in 4,000,000. The annual incidence has been estimated at 4 per 100 million per year.

== Signs and symptoms ==
The most common clinical features of MEN2B are:

- a tall, thin, "marfanoid" body build, in which long bones are disproportionately elongated;
- masses beneath mucosal surfaces in the mouth, lips, and eyes (discussed below);
- low muscle mass, sometimes with myopathy;
- gastrointestinal complaints, especially constipation;
- symptoms derived from medullary carcinoma of the thyroid;
- symptoms derived from pheochromocytoma;
- craniosynostosis;
- dry eyes or lack of tears;
- delayed puberty.

A patient with Multiple endocrine neoplasia type 2B, presenting with mucosal neuromas.

Unlike Marfan syndrome, the cardiovascular system and the lens of the eye are unaffected. Mucosal neuromas are the most consistent and distinctive feature, appearing in 100% of patients. Usually there are numerous yellowish-white, sessile, painless nodules on the lips or tongue, with deeper lesions having normal coloration. There may be enough neuromas in the body of the lips to produce enlargement and a "blubbery lip" appearance. Similar nodules may be seen on the sclera and eyelids.

Histologically, neuromata contain a characteristic adventitious plaque of tissue composed of hyperplastic, interlacing bands of Schwann cells and myelinated fibers overlay the posterior columns of the spinal cord. Mucosal neuromas are made up of nerve cells, often with thickened perineurium, intertwined with one another in a plexiform pattern. This tortuous pattern of nerves is seen within a background of loose endoneurium-like fibrous stroma.

== Causes ==
Variations in the RET proto-oncogene cause MEN2B. In recent decades no case of MEN2B has been reported that lacks such a variation. The M918T variant alone is responsible for approximately 95% of cases. All DNA variants that cause MEN2B are thought to enhance signaling through the RET protein, which is a receptor molecule found on cell membranes, whose ligands are part of the transforming growth factor beta signaling system.

About half of cases are inherited from a parent as an autosomal dominant trait. The other half appear to be spontaneous mutations, usually arising in the paternal allele, particularly from older fathers. The sex ratio in de novo cases is also uneven: sons are twice as likely to develop MEN 2B as daughters.

== Diagnosis ==
=== Differential diagnosis ===
DNA testing is now the preferred method of establishing a diagnosis for MEN 2B, and is thought to be almost 100% sensitive and specific. Gordon et al. reported cases of a difference disease—the "multiple mucosal neuroma syndrome"—having the physical phenotype of MEN2B, but without variations in the RET gene and without malignancy.

MEN2B should be entertained as a diagnosis whenever a person is found to have either medullary thyroid carcinoma or pheochromocytoma. Before DNA testing became available, measurement of serum calcitonin was the most important laboratory test for MEN2B. Calcitonin is produced by the "C" cells of the thyroid, which, because they are always hyperplastic or malignant in MEN2B, produce more calcitonin than normal. Calcitonin levels remain a valuable marker to detect recurrence of medullary thyroid carcinoma after thyroidectomy.

Luxol fast blue staining identifies myelin sheathing of some fibers, and lesional cells react immunohistochemically for S-100 protein, collagen type IV, vimentin, NSE, and neural filaments. More mature lesions will react also for EMA, indicating a certain amount of perineurial differentiation. Early lesions, rich in acid mucopolysaccharides, stain positively with alcian blue. When medullary thyroid cancer is present, levels of the hormone calcitonin are elevated in serum and urine. Under the microscope, tumors may closely resemble traumatic neuroma, but the streaming fascicles of mucosal neuroma are usually more uniform and the intertwining nerves of the traumatic neuroma lack the thick perineurium of the mucosal neuroma. Inflammatory cells are not seen in the stroma and dysplasia is not present in the neural tissues.

== Treatment ==
Without treatment, persons with MEN2B die prematurely. Owing to the absence of formal studies, details are lacking. It is generally assumed that death around the age of 31 is typical unless prophylactic thyroidectomy and surveillance for pheochromocytoma are performed. The range can be quite variable, however: though death early in childhood is usual, at least one male patient is known to have survived until the age of 68. In 2006, experience with the disease suggested "that the prognosis in an individual patient may be better than previously considered."

Thyroidectomy is the mainstay of treatment, and should be performed without delay as soon as a diagnosis of MEN2B is made, even if no malignancy is detectable in the thyroid. Without thyroidectomy, almost all patients with MEN2B develop medullary thyroid cancer, in a more aggressive form than MEN 2A. The ideal age for surgery is 4 years old or younger, since cancer may metastasize before age 10.

Pheochromocytoma - a hormone secreting tumor of the adrenal glands - is also present in 50% of cases. Affected individuals are encouraged to get yearly screenings for thyroid and adrenal cancer.

Because prophylactic thyroidectomy improves survival, blood relatives of a person with MEN2B should be evaluated for MEN2B, even if lacking the typical signs and symptoms of the disorder.The mucosal neuromas of this syndrome are asymptomatic and self-limiting, and present no problem requiring treatment. They may, however, be surgically removed for aesthetic purposes or if they are being constantly traumatized.

== Society and culture ==
=== Abraham Lincoln hypothesis ===
In 2007, Dr. John Sotos proposed that President Abraham Lincoln had MEN2B. This theory suggests Lincoln had all the major features of the disease: a marfan-like body habitus, large, bumpy lips, constipation, muscular hypotonia, a history compatible with cancer, along with a family history possibly suggestive of the disorder. The "mole" on Lincoln's right cheek, the asymmetry of his face, his large jaw, his drooping eyelid, and "pseudo-depression" are also suggested as manifestations of MEN2B. Lincoln's relative longevity (dying at 56 of a gunshot wound) is the principal challenge to the MEN2B theory. As a result, whether Lincoln had MEN2B remains an open question and could only be proven definitively by DNA testing of a verified Lincoln relic, most probably dating from the assassination.

== See also ==
- Multiple endocrine neoplasia
- Multiple endocrine neoplasia type 1
- Multiple endocrine neoplasia type 2a
