= Icovamenib =

Chemical compound

Clinical data
- Other names: BMF-219

Legal status
- Legal status: Investigational

Identifiers
- IUPAC name: N-[4-(4-Morpholin-4-yl-7H-pyrrolo[2,3-d]pyrimidin-6-yl)phenyl]-4-[[(3R)-3-(prop-2-enoylamino)piperidin-1-yl]methyl]pyridine-2-carboxamide
- CAS Number: 2448172-22-1
- PubChem CID: 154988914
- ChemSpider: 115037287
- UNII: 2Z737MY35A

Chemical and physical data
- Formula: C_{31}H_{34}N_{8}O_{3}
- Molar mass: 566.666 g·mol^{−1}
- 3D model (JSmol): Interactive image
- SMILES: C=CC(=O)N[C@@H]1CCCN(C1)CC2=CC(=NC=C2)C(=O)NC3=CC=C(C=C3)C4=CC5=C(N4)N=CN=C5N6CCOCC6
- InChI: InChI=1S/C31H34N8O3/c1-2-28(40)35-24-4-3-11-38(19-24)18-21-9-10-32-27(16-21)31(41)36-23-7-5-22(6-8-23)26-17-25-29(37-26)33-20-34-30(25)39-12-14-42-15-13-39/h2,5-10,16-17,20,24H,1,3-4,11-15,18-19H2,(H,35,40)(H,36,41)(H,33,34,37)/t24-/m1/s1; Key:CPRLHPSXWZTPMC-XMMPIXPASA-N

Icovamenib is an investigational irreversible covalent inhibitor of menin. It is developed by Biomea Fusion for diabetes, lymphoma, leukemia, and multiple myeloma.
