= August Wagenmann =

German ophthalmologist (1863–1955)

August Emil Ludwig Wagenmann (born 5 April 1863 in Göttingen; died 12 August 1955 in Heidelberg) was a German ophthalmologist.

August Wagenmann obtained a degree of medical doctor at the universities of Göttingen and Munich. After graduation, he received a position of assistant doctor in the Eye Clinic at Göttingen University, which was chaired by Theodor Leber. In 1888, August Wagenmann was qualified as a privatdocent in ophthalmology.

In 1892 he was appointed to the position of chair of the ophthalmology department at the University of Jena, and held that position until 1910. In 1935 Wagenmann became professor emeritus. A year later Wagenmann was honored with the honorary membership of the German Ophthalmological Society.

August Wagenmann was the author of numerous scientific articles, especially in the field of pathological anatomy. His experimental work on circulation problems in the choroidal and retinal vessels were rewarded by the reception of the Albrecht von Graefe Prize.

In 1922 he was the first to describe the disease Multiple endocrine neoplasia type 2b.

== Main publications ==
- Beitrag zur Kenntniss der Circulationsstörungen in den Netzhautgefässen, 1897
- Beitrag zur Kenntniss der Zündhütchenverletzungen des Auges, 1897
- Ueber zweimalige Durchbohrung der Augenhäute bei Eisensplitterverletzungen, 1901
- Zur Casuistik der Fremdkörperverletzungen des Auges, 1901
- Die Verletzungen des Auges: Mit Berücksichtigung der Unfallversicherung, In: Band 9, Teil 5 von Handbuch der gesamten Augenheilkunde / Graefe-Saemisch, Ausgabe 2, Engelmann, 1913
- Multiple Neurome des Auges und der Zunge. In: Ber Dtsch Ophthalmol. Bd. 43, 1922, S. 282–285.
