= Wiedemann–Steiner syndrome =

Wiedemann–Steiner syndrome (WSS)
- Other names: Hypertrichosis-short stature-facial dysmorphism-developmental delay syndrome

Wiedemann–Steiner syndrome (WSS) is a rare genetic disorder that causes developmental delay, unusual facial features, short stature, and reduction in muscle tone (hypotonia). The syndrome was originally described in 1989 by Hans-Rudolf Wiedemann. The genetic basis for the syndrome was identified by Dr. Wendy D. Jones in 2012. The first case was reported in 1989 by Wiedemann and colleagues which reported a Caucasian boy with pre- and postnatal growth deficiency, psychomotor delay, and a round and flat face, short nose, widely spaced eyes, long philtrum, short palpebral fissures, low-set ears, and high-arched palate. Other findings included an alternating convergent squint, dilatation of the renal calyces, and short and thick limbs. Later decades brought about more finding and descriptions of this disorder.

== Signs and symptoms ==
Features described in Wiedemann–Steiner syndrome include:

- Short stature
- Developmental delay
- Low muscle tone (hypotonia) especially in infancy
- Characteristic facial features
- Hairy elbows (hypertrichosis cubiti)

== Cause ==
Wiedemann–Steiner syndrome results from mutations in the MLL (also known as KMT2A) gene on the long arm of chromosome 11. The gene encodes a histone-modification enzyme — that is, it helps modify the expression of other genes. The condition is autosomal dominant, meaning that only one abnormal copy of the gene is needed for a person to have the syndrome.

The mechanism by which mutations in the MLL gene cause the phenotype of Wiedemann–Steiner syndrome is not yet known.

== Screening ==
If Wiedemann–Steiner syndrome is suspected, analysis of the MLL gene can be carried out. Otherwise, it may be diagnosed by whole-exome sequencing or whole genome sequencing.

There have also been patients with Wiedemann–Steiner syndrome who were initially mis-diagnosed with Kabuki syndrome.

== Treatment ==
There is no specific cure or treatment for Wiedemann–Steiner syndrome. Children with this condition may benefit from a range of supportive treatments such as physiotherapy, speech therapy, supplementary nutrition for poor feeding, and special educational support.

== Epidemiology ==
A little over 1000 people have been documented with the condition worldwide. Once thought to have an incidence of 1 in 1,000,000, some research has suggested the incidence may be as high as 1 in 40,000 The approximate number of WSS cases are seemingly low today but offspring of those with WSS have half the chance of having the disorder themselves. There is no current evidence that the life expectancy of individuals with WSS is shortened.
