= Hans-Rudolf Wiedemann =

German pediatrician known for several rare disease syndromes

- Born: February 16, 1915; Bremen, Germany
- Died: August 4, 2006 (aged 91); Kiel, Germany
- Citizenship: German
- Education: University of Freiburg, Ludwig-Maximilians-Universität München, University of Hamburg, University of Lausanne, University of Jena
- Known for: Rare diseases
- Spouse: Gisela von Sybel
- Scientific career
- Fields: Pediatrician, Teacher, Autograph collector
- Doctoral advisor: Yusuf Ibrahim

Hans-Rudolf Wiedemann (16 February 1915 in Bremen, Germany – 4 August 2006 in Kiel, Germany) was a German pediatrician, university professor, and autograph collector.

== Life ==
Wiedemann was born in Bremen. His father was a medical practitioner. His mother came from a medical family. Wiedemann studied medicine at the University of Freiburg, the Ludwig-Maximilians-Universität München, the University of Hamburg, the University of Lausanne and the University of Jena.

In 1940, Wiedemann passed the state examination. With a doctoral thesis with Yusuf Ibrahim he was appointed doctor of medicine in 1941 at the University of Jena. At the University of Jena, he wrote and researched jaundice. He continued with specialist training in Bremen, Bonn and Münster. As director of the Krefeld Children's Hospital, Wiedemann was one of the first to recognise the fatal side effects of thalidomide. While initially considered safe, thalidomide was responsible for teratogenic deformities in children born after their mothers used it during pregnancies, prior to the third trimester. In November 1961, thalidomide was taken off the market due to massive pressure from the press and public.

Kiel University appointed Wiedemann in 1961 as Chairman of Pediatrics. In 1977, he was chairman of the German Society for Paediatrics Medicine. In 1980, he became professor emeritus. Wiedemann collected and wrote several books about autographs with his wife Gisela von Sybel.

Wiedemann died in Kiel in 2006.

== Honors ==
Among his honors are:

- Member of the German Academy of Sciences Leopoldina (1969)
- Honorary member of the German Society for Pediatrics (1982)
- Wiedemann–Steiner syndrome (named after)
- Beckwith–Wiedemann syndrome (named after)
- Genée–Wiedemann syndrome (named after)
- The world of autographs - Gisela and Hans-Rudolf Wiedemann. German Schiller Society, Marbach am Neckar 1994.
