= KMT2A =

Protein-coding gene in the species Homo sapiens

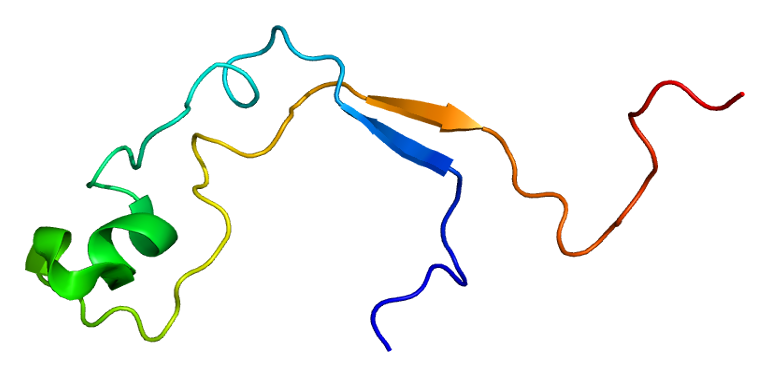

Identifiers
- Aliases: KMT2A, ALL-1, CXXC7, HRX, HTRX1, MLL, MLL/GAS7, MLL1, MLL1A, TET1-MLL, TRX1, WDSTS, MLL-AF9, lysine methyltransferase 2A, Histone-lysine N-methyltransferase HRX, ALL1, HTRX
- External IDs: MGI: 96995; GeneCards: KMT2A
Available structures
PDB	Ortholog search: PDBe RCSB
PDB	List of PDB id codes 2AGH, 2J2S, 2JYI, 2KKF, 2KU7, 2KYU, 2LXS, 2LXT, 2MTN, 2W5Y, 2W5Z, 3EG6, 3EMH, 3LQI, 3LQJ, 3P4F, 3U85, 3U88, 4ESG, 4GQ6, 4NW3, 5F6L, 5F5E
Enzyme activity
EC #	BRENDA	ExPASy	KEGG	MetaCyc
2.1.1.364	↗	↗	↗	↗

Gene location (Human)
Chr.	Chromosome 11 (human)
Band	11q23.3	Start	118,436,456 bp
Band	11q23.3	End	118,526,832 bp

Gene location (Mouse)
Chr.	Chromosome 9 (mouse)
Band	9 A5.2|9 24.84 cM	Start	44,714,652 bp
Band	9 A5.2|9 24.84 cM	End	44,792,594 bp
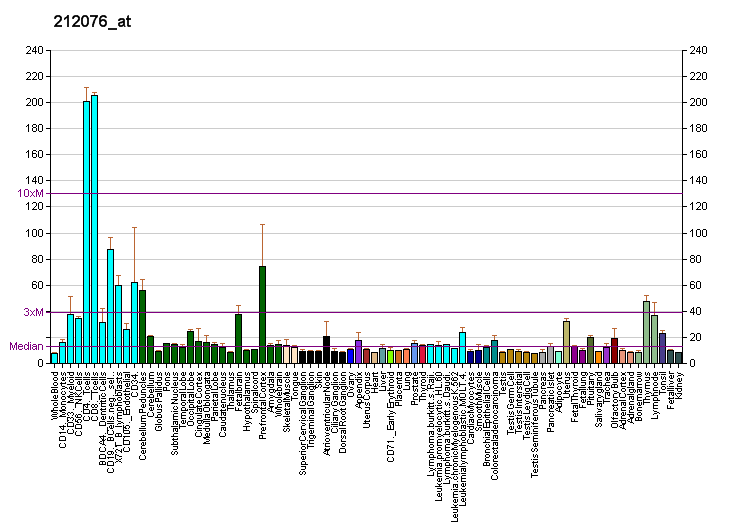

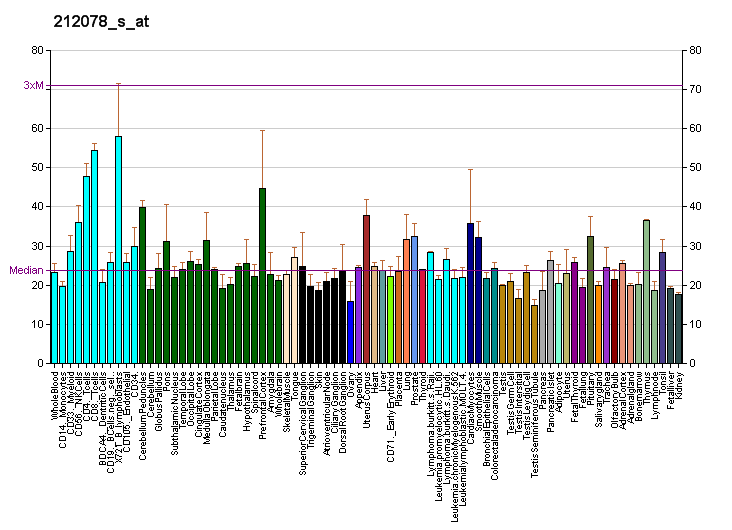

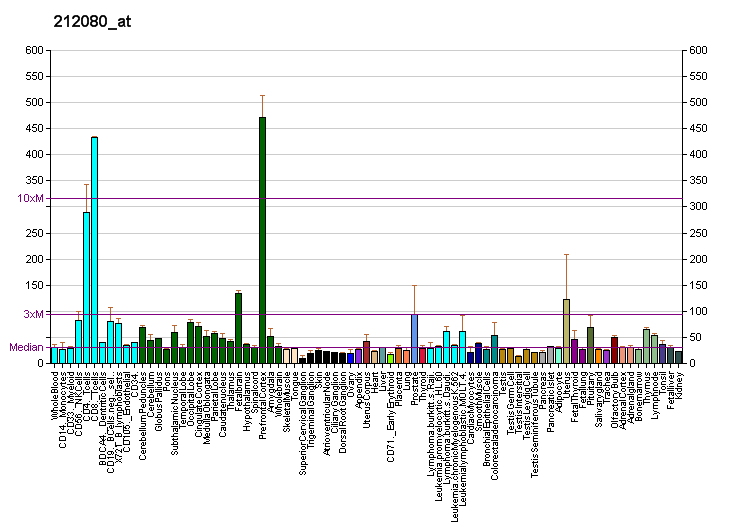
RNA expression pattern
Bgee	Human / Mouse (ortholog); Top expressed in: ventricular zone; epithelium of colon; sural nerve; ganglionic eminence; Achilles tendon; Brodmann area 23; bone marrow cell; cerebellar vermis; lateral nuclear group of thalamus; external globus pallidus / Top expressed in: tail of embryo; genital tubercle; dorsomedial hypothalamic nucleus; Rostral migratory stream; CA3 field; cingulate gyrus; central gray substance of midbrain; habenula; neural layer of retina; entorhinal cortex; More reference expression data
BioGPS	More reference expression data
Gene ontology
Molecular function	methyltransferase activity; transferase activity; DNA binding; protein homodimerization activity; minor groove of adenine-thymine-rich DNA binding; DNA-binding transcription factor activity; zinc ion binding; chromatin binding; metal ion binding; core promoter sequence-specific DNA binding; protein binding; unmethylated CpG binding; lysine-acetylated histone binding; identical protein binding; histone-lysine N-methyltransferase activity; histone methyltransferase activity (H3-K4 specific); DNA-binding transcription factor activity, RNA polymerase II-specific; RNA polymerase II cis-regulatory region sequence-specific DNA binding
Cellular component	nucleoplasm; nucleus; histone methyltransferase complex; cytosol; MLL1 complex
Biological process	visual learning; response to potassium ion; regulation of transcription, DNA-templated; cognition; positive regulation of transporter activity; positive regulation of cellular response to drug; response to light stimulus; rhythmic process; regulation of short-term neuronal synaptic plasticity; histone H3-K4 trimethylation; membrane depolarization; regulation of histone H3-K4 methylation; regulation of histone H3-K9 acetylation; transcription by RNA polymerase II; post-embryonic development; peptidyl-lysine monomethylation; spleen development; circadian regulation of gene expression; regulation of histone H3-K14 acetylation; transcription, DNA-templated; regulation of histone H3-K27 acetylation; positive regulation of transcription, DNA-templated; DNA methylation; histone H3-K4 methylation; methylation; positive regulation of histone H3-K4 methylation; exploration behavior; embryonic hemopoiesis; histone H3-K4 dimethylation; regulation of gene expression; homeostasis of number of cells within a tissue; histone H4-K16 acetylation; definitive hemopoiesis; anterior/posterior pattern specification; negative regulation of cell population proliferation; apoptotic process; regulation of megakaryocyte differentiation; regulation of hematopoietic stem cell differentiation; chromatin organization; positive regulation of transcription by RNA polymerase II; protein-containing complex assembly; negative regulation of DNA methylation
Sources:Amigo / QuickGO
Orthologs
Databases	NCBI: entry; OMA: entry
Species	Human	Mouse
Entrez	4297	214162
Ensembl	ENSG00000118058	ENSMUSG00000002028
UniProt	Q03164	P55200
RefSeq (mRNA)	NM_001197104; NM_005933; NM_024891	NM_001081049; NM_001357549
RefSeq (protein)	NP_001184033; NP_005924	NP_001344478
Location (UCSC)	Chr 11: 118.44 – 118.53 Mb	Chr 9: 44.71 – 44.79 Mb
PubMed search
- Wikidata
View/Edit Human	View/Edit Mouse

Histone-lysine-methyltransferase 2A is an enzyme that in humans is encoded by the KMT2A gene. It is a transcriptional coactivator and histone methyltransferase whose SET domain catalyses methylation of lysine 4 on histone H3, a chromatin modification associated with transcriptional activation.

Histone-lysine-methyltransferase 2A regulates cell reproduction. It is active in generating blood cells (hematopoiesis) and during early development. KMT2A rearrangements are known genetic translocations of KMT2A and are a cause of acute leukemias and other cancers. Rearrangements of KMT2A are markers for diagnosis, prognosis, and treatment of acute leukemias. Mutations or dysregulation of the KMT2A protein product are also involved in several other types of cancers as well as developmental abnormalities such as Wiedemann-Steiner syndrome.

This protein belongs to the group of histone-modifying enzymes comprising transactivation domain 9aaTAD and is involved in the epigenetic maintenance of transcriptional memory. Its role as an epigenetic regulator of neuronal function is an ongoing area of research.

== Gene ==
KMT2A gene has 37 exons and resides on chromosome 11 at q23.

== Structure ==
The human KMT2A protein contains a total of 3,969 amino acid residues and contains the following motifs and domains (reading from the N-terminus to C-terminus):

KMT2A protein domain architecture
Order	Element	Type	Pfam accession	InterPro accession	Position (aa)	Function
1	Menin-binding motif (MBM)	Motif	—	—	6–25	Mediates direct interaction with menin (MEN1); this interaction is the target of menin inhibitors in KMT2A-rearranged leukemia
2	Integrase-binding motif 1 (IBM1)	Motif	—	—	123–134	Binds the integrase-binding domain of PSIP1/LEDGF, contributing to chromatin targeting
3	Integrase-binding motif 2 (IBM2)	Motif	—	—	147–152	Second PSIP1/LEDGF-binding motif, acting together with IBM1
4	AT-hook 1	DNA-binding motif	—	—	169–180	Binds AT-rich minor-groove DNA sequences
5	AT-hook 2	DNA-binding motif	—	—	217–227	Second AT-rich DNA-binding motif
6	AT-hook 3	DNA-binding motif	—	—	301–309	Third AT-rich DNA-binding motif
7	CXXC zinc finger domain	Domain	PF02008	IPR002857	1148–1194	Binds unmethylated CpG dinucleotides; typically retained in the N-terminal fragment of leukemogenic KMT2A fusion proteins
8	PHD finger (1)	Domain	PF00628	IPR019787	1482–1530	Chromatin-reader zinc finger; part of the PHD-finger cluster mediating protein–protein interactions
9	PHD finger (2)	Domain	PF00628	IPR019787	1569–1624	Second PHD finger of the cluster; contributes to histone/protein recognition
10	PHD-like zinc-binding domain	Domain	PF13771	—	1900–1978	Atypical (extended) PHD-like zinc-binding module downstream of the PHD cluster
11	F/Y-rich N-terminal domain (FYRN)	Domain	PF05964	IPR003888	2019–2074	Pairs structurally with the downstream FYRC domain despite the large sequence separation
12	F/Y-rich C-terminal domain (FYRC)	Domain	PF05965	IPR003889	3669–3748	Folds together with FYRN to form a single structural unit; sits just upstream of the catalytic SET domain
13	SET domain	Domain	PF00856	IPR001214	3840–3945	C-terminal catalytic domain conferring H3K4 histone methyltransferase activity; lost from the oncogenic N-terminal fragment in KMT2A-rearranged fusions

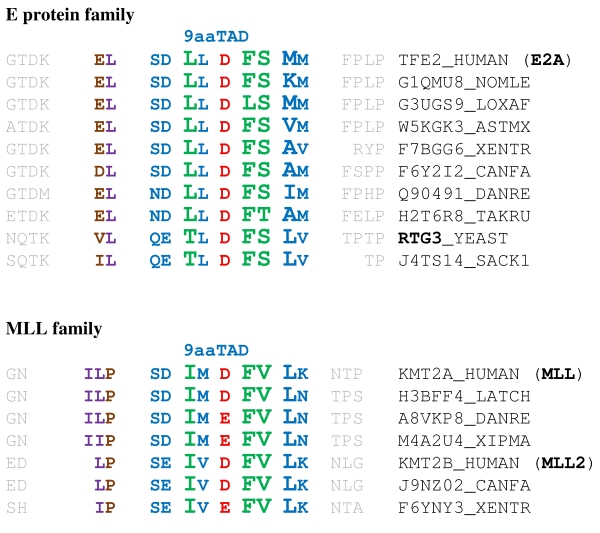
9aaTADs in the E protein family

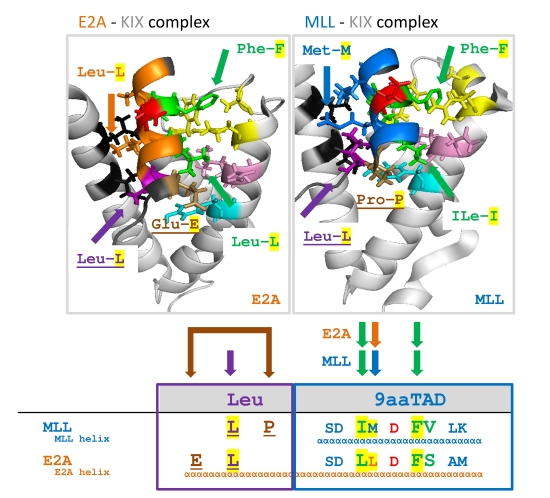
E2A and MLL binding to the KIX domain of CBP

KMT2A has over a dozen binding partners and is cleaved into two pieces, a larger N-terminal fragment, involved in gene repression, and a smaller C-terminal fragment, which is a transcriptional activator. The cleavage, followed by the association of the two fragments, is necessary for KMT2A to be fully active. Like many other methyltransferases, the KMT2 family members exist in multisubunit nuclear complexes (human COMPASS), where other subunits also mediate the enzymatic activity.

== Function ==
=== Transcriptional regulation ===
KMT2A gene encodes a transcriptional coactivator that plays an essential role in regulating gene expression during early development and hematopoiesis. The encoded protein contains multiple conserved functional domains. One of these domains, the SET domain, is responsible for its histone H3 lysine 4 (H3K4) methyltransferase activity which mediates chromatin modifications associated with epigenetic transcriptional activation. Enriched in the nucleus, the KMT2A enzyme trimethylates H3K4 (H3K4me3). It also upregulates mono- and dimethylation of H3K4. This protein is processed by the enzyme Taspase 1 into two fragments, MLL-C (~180 kDa) and MLL-N (~320 kDa). These fragments then assemble into different multi-protein complexes that regulate the transcription of specific target genes, including many of the HOX genes.

Transcriptome profiling after deletion of KMT2A in cortical neurons revealed decreased promoter-bound H3K4me3 peaks at 318 genes, with 31 of these having significantly decreased expression and promoter binding. Among them were Meis2, a homeobox transcription factor critical for development of forebrain neurons and Satb2, a protein involved in neuronal differentiation.

Multiple chromosomal translocations involving this gene are the cause of certain acute lymphoid leukemias and acute myeloid leukemias. Alternate splicing results in multiple transcript variants.

=== Cognition and emotion ===
KMT2A has been shown to be an important epigenetic regulator of complex behaviors. Rodent models of MLL1 dysfunction in forebrain neurons showed that conditional deletion results in elevated anxiety and defective cognition. Prefrontal cortex-specific knockout of KMT2A results in the same phenotypes, as well as working memory deficits.

=== Stem cells ===
KMT2A has been found to be an important regulator of epiblast-derived stem cells, post-implantation epiblast derived stem cells which display pluripotency yet many recognizable differences from the traditional embryonic stem cells derived from inner cell mass prior to implantation. Suppression of KMT2A expression was shown to be adequate for inducing ESC-like morphology and behavior within 72 hours of treatment. It has been proposed that the small molecule inhibitor MM-401, which was used to inhibit KMT2A, changes the distribution of H3K4me1, the single methylation of the histone H3 lysine 4, to be significantly downregulated at KMT2A targets thus leading to decreased expression of KMT2A targets, rather than a direct regulation of pluripotency core markers.

== Clinical significance ==
The dysregulation of the KMT2A gene underlies a broad spectrum of human disease from cancer to developmental abnormalities.

=== Cancer ===
KMT2A is one of the most significant genes in cancer. Chromosomal rearrangements generating KMT2A fusion proteins with more than 90 partners (most commonly AFF1, MLLT1, MLLT3, and MLLT10). KMT2A gene rearrangements drive acute myeloid and acute lymphoblastic leukemias. Nearly 80% of infant acute lymphoblastic leukemia cases contain KMT2A gene rearrangements and KMT2A rearrangements are strongly associated with poor outcomes.

Related alterations such as KMT2A gene duplication (increased dosage of otherwise-normal KMT2A) and KMT2A-PTD ( partial tandem gene duplication that produces a functionally abnormal protein) likewise confer poor prognosis in myelodysplastic syndrome and acute myeloid leukemia. Amplification linked to a median survival of only 2–3 months. Beyond leukemia, KMT2A alterations occur in high-grade B-cell lymphoma and various solid tumors including sarcomas, pancreatic cancer, and colorectal cancer.

These findings have motivated the development of targeted therapeutic strategies against KMT2A's protein partners and interactions, including menin inhibitors such as revumenib, DOT1L inhibitors such as pinometostat, and agents targeting BRD4, LSD1, and WDR5.

=== Developmental abnormalities ===
Mutations in KMT2A cause Wiedemann-Steiner syndrome. Germline loss-of-function mutations in KMT2A cause Wiedemann–Steiner syndrome, an autosomal dominant disorder marked by intellectual disability, developmental delay, hypotonia, short stature, and characteristic craniofacial and skeletal features.

=== Inflammation ===
KMT2A is required for the expression of senescence-associated secretory phenotype (SASP)-related genes and promotes increased inflammation.

=== Neurological disorders ===
Abnormal H3K4 trimethylation has been implicated in several neurological disorders such as autism. Humans with cognitive and neurodevelopmental disease often have dysregulation of H3K4 methylation in prefrontal cortex (PFC) neurons. It also may participate in the process of GAD67 downregulation in schizophrenia.

== Interactions ==
MLL (gene) has been shown to interact with:

- ASH2L,
- CREBBP,
- CTBP1,
- HDAC1,
- HCFC1,
- MEN1,
- PPIE,
- PPP1R15A,
- RBBP5, and
- WDR5.

== See also ==
- KMT2A rearrangements
