= Nevoid hypertrichosis =

- Other names: Hair nevus
- Specialty: Dermatology

Nevoid hypertrichosis is a cutaneous condition characterized by the growth of terminal hairs in a circumscribed area. Nevoid hypertrichosis often presents shortly after birth. The cause of nevoid hypertrichosis is unknown. The diagnosis is made based on clinical and histopathological examination.

== Signs and symptoms ==
Nevoid hypertrichosis is a rare disorder characterized by a confined patch of coarse terminal hair. It often manifests at or shortly after birth, while it sporadically manifests later in life. The lesion is known to stay stable, and the child's growth is directly correlated with any size rise. Though reports of spontaneous resolution are rare, it usually persists. It typically manifests as one or more isolated patches.

The absence of any underlying pigmentary alteration or other lesions is the traditional unifying characteristic of these lesions. The hair in the lesions is the same color as the hair on the scalp; nevertheless, there have been instances of premature graying of the hair in the patch as well as depigmented hair.

== Causes ==
Whether nevoid hypertrichosis is a genetically determined condition or a deformity of unknown etiology remains unclear. In giant nevoid hypertrichosis, an autosomal dominant pattern of inheritance has been suggested.

== Diagnosis ==
Histopathological analysis and traditional cutaneous appearance serve as the foundation for the diagnosis. Histopathology is usually required to rule out any underlying nevus, but it typically reveals a normal epidermis with an increased number of morphologically normal hair follicles in the dermis.

Congenital hairy melanocytic nevus, congenital hypertichosis lanuginosa, plexiform neurofibroma, and generalized hypertrichosis are differential diagnoses that need to be ruled out in cases with early onset. Becker's nevus, late onset melanocytic nevus, and smooth muscle hamartoma should be taken into consideration for patients with a delayed onset.

== Treatment ==
For management, the patient should be counseled about the condition's benign nature, which will relieve their anxieties. The goal of treatment is to improve appearance, particularly if the lesion is on a body part that is visible. Long pulsed neodymium-doped yttrium aluminum garnet and alexandrite lasers have been tried for laser hair reduction with positive cosmetic results.

== See also ==
- Onychauxis
- List of cutaneous conditions
