= MEN1 =

Protein

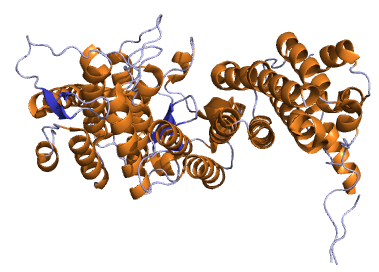

Identifiers
- Aliases: MEN1, MEAI, SCG2, menin 1
- External IDs: OMIM: 613733; MGI: 1316736; GeneCards: MEN1
Available structures
PDB	Ortholog search: PDBe RCSB
PDB	List of PDB id codes 3U84, 3U85, 3U86, 3U88, 4GPQ, 4GQ3, 4GQ4, 4I80, 4OG3, 4OG4, 4OG5, 4OG6, 4OG7, 4OG8, 4X5Y, 4X5Z, 5DDF, 5DD9, 5DDA, 5DDE, 5DDB, 5DDD, 5DDC, 5DB0, 5DB3, 5DB1, 5DB2

Gene location (Human)
Chr.	Chromosome 11 (human)
Band	11q13.1	Start	64,803,510 bp
Band	11q13.1	End	64,811,294 bp

Gene location (Mouse)
Chr.	Chromosome 19 (mouse)
Band	19|19 A	Start	6,385,009 bp
Band	19|19 A	End	6,390,921 bp
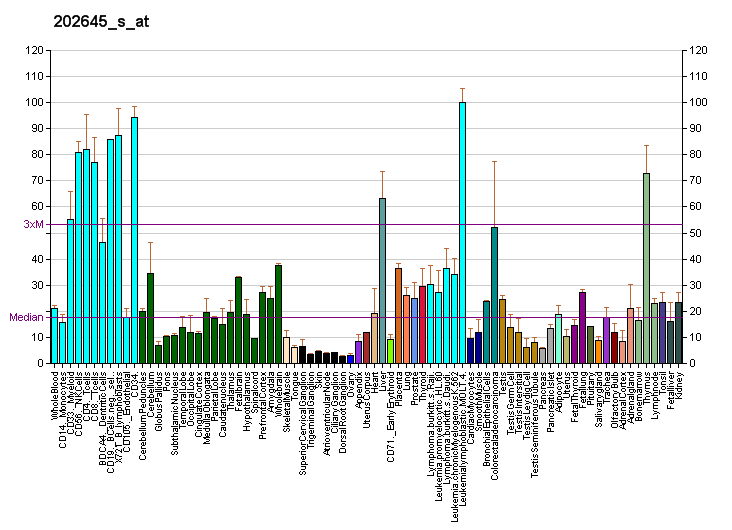
RNA expression pattern
Bgee	Human / Mouse (ortholog); Top expressed in: granulocyte; right hemisphere of cerebellum; right adrenal gland; ganglionic eminence; ventricular zone; mucosa of transverse colon; right adrenal cortex; right lobe of liver; right lobe of thyroid gland; left adrenal gland / Top expressed in: genital tubercle; tail of embryo; epiblast; ventricular zone; ganglionic eminence; yolk sac; adrenal gland; striatum of neuraxis; mesencephalon; neural tube; More reference expression data
BioGPS	More reference expression data
Gene ontology
Molecular function	DNA binding; protein-macromolecule adaptor activity; R-SMAD binding; protein N-terminus binding; chromatin binding; histone-lysine N-methyltransferase activity; protein binding; four-way junction DNA binding; Y-form DNA binding; double-stranded DNA binding
Cellular component	cytoplasm; cytosol; nuclear matrix; nucleoplasm; chromatin; cleavage furrow; nucleus; histone methyltransferase complex; endoplasmic reticulum lumen; protein-containing complex
Biological process	negative regulation of cell-substrate adhesion; negative regulation of protein phosphorylation; positive regulation of transforming growth factor beta receptor signaling pathway; regulation of transcription, DNA-templated; negative regulation of cyclin-dependent protein serine/threonine kinase activity; negative regulation of telomerase activity; negative regulation of cell cycle; regulation of activin receptor signaling pathway; negative regulation of transcription by RNA polymerase II; negative regulation of DNA-binding transcription factor activity; negative regulation of osteoblast differentiation; negative regulation of cell cycle G1/S phase transition; MAPK cascade; cellular response to DNA damage stimulus; negative regulation of JNK cascade; brain development; cellular response to peptide hormone stimulus; decidualization; negative regulation of epithelial cell proliferation; mitotic cell cycle; osteoblast development; positive regulation of protein binding; negative regulation of transcription, DNA-templated; response to gamma radiation; response to UV; type B pancreatic cell differentiation; DNA repair; regulation of type B pancreatic cell proliferation; cellular response to glucose stimulus; positive regulation of transcription by RNA polymerase II; negative regulation of cell population proliferation; response to transforming growth factor beta; histone lysine methylation; beta-catenin-TCF complex assembly; transcription, DNA-templated; post-translational protein modification; chromatin organization
Sources:Amigo / QuickGO
Orthologs
Databases	NCBI: entry; OMA: entry
Species	Human	Mouse
Entrez	4221	17283
Ensembl	ENSG00000133895	ENSMUSG00000024947
UniProt	O00255	O88559
RefSeq (mRNA)	NM_000244; NM_130799; NM_130800; NM_130801; NM_130802 NM_130803; NM_130804; NM_001370251; NM_001370259; NM_001370260; NM_001370261; NM_001370262; NM_001370263	NM_001168488; NM_001168489; NM_001168490; NM_008583
RefSeq (protein)	NP_000235; NP_570711; NP_570712; NP_570713; NP_570714 NP_570715; NP_570716; NP_001357180; NP_001357188; NP_001357189; NP_001357190; NP_001357191; NP_001357192	NP_001161960; NP_001161961; NP_001161962; NP_032609
Location (UCSC)	Chr 11: 64.8 – 64.81 Mb	Chr 19: 6.39 – 6.39 Mb
PubMed search
- Wikidata
View/Edit Human	View/Edit Mouse

Menin is a protein that in humans is encoded by the MEN1 gene. Menin is a putative tumor suppressor associated with multiple endocrine neoplasia type 1 (MEN-1 syndrome) and has autosomal dominant inheritance. Variations in the MEN1 gene can cause pituitary adenomas, hyperparathyroidism, pancreatic neuroendocrine tumors, gastrinoma, and adrenocortical cancers.

In vitro studies have shown that menin is localized to the nucleus, possesses two functional nuclear localization signals, and inhibits transcriptional activation by JunD. However, the function of this protein is not known. Two messages have been detected on northern blots but the larger message has not been characterized. Two variants of the shorter transcript have been identified where alternative splicing affects the coding sequence. Five variants where alternative splicing takes place in the 5' UTR have also been identified.

== History ==
In 1988, researchers at Uppsala University Hospital and the Karolinska Institute in Stockholm mapped the MEN1 gene to the long arm of chromosome 11. The gene was finally cloned in 1997.

== Genomics ==
The gene is located on long arm of chromosome 11 (11q13) between base pairs 64,570,985 and 64,578,765. It has 10 exons and encodes a 610-amino acid protein.

Over 1300 mutations have been reported to date (2010). The majority (>70%) of these are predicted to lead to truncated forms are scattered throughout the gene. Four - c.249_252delGTCT (deletion at codons 83-84), c.1546_1547insC (insertion at codon 516), c.1378C>T (Arg460Ter) and c.628_631delACAG (deletion at codons 210-211) have been reported to occur in 4.5%, 2.7%, 2.6% and 2.5% of families.

== Clinical implications ==
The MEN1 phenotype is inherited via an autosomal-dominant pattern and is associated with neoplasms of the pituitary gland, the parathyroid gland, and the pancreas (the 3 "P"s). While these neoplasias are often benign (in contrast to tumours occurring in MEN2A), they are adenomas and, therefore, produce endocrine phenotypes. Pancreatic presentations of the MEN1 phenotype may manifest as Zollinger–Ellison syndrome.

MEN1 pituitary tumours are adenomas of anterior cells, typically prolactinomas or growth hormone-secreting. Pancreatic tumours involve the islet cells, giving rise to gastrinomas or insulinomas. In rare cases, adrenal cortex tumours are also seen.

== Role in cancer ==
Most germline or somatic mutations in the MEN1 gene predict truncation or absence of encoded menin resulting in the inability of MEN1 to act as a tumor suppressor gene. Such mutations in MEN1 have been associated with defective binding of encoded menin to proteins implicated in genetic and epigenetic mechanisms. Menin is a 621 amino acid protein associated with insulinomas which acts as an adapter while also interacting with partner proteins involved in vital cell activities such as transcriptional regulation, cell division, cell proliferation, and genome stability. Insulinomas are neuroendocrine tumors of the pancreas with an incidence of 0.4 % which usually are benign solitary tumors but 5-12 % of cases have distant metastasis at diagnosis. These familial MEN-1 and sporadic tumors may arise either due to loss of heterozygosity or the chromosome region 11q13 where MEN1 is located, or due to presence of mutations in the gene.

MEN1 mutations comprise mostly frameshift deletions or insertions, followed by nonsense, missense, splice-site mutations and either part or complete gene deletions resulting in disease pathology. Frameshift and nonsense mutations result in a supposed inactive and truncated menin protein while splice-site mutations result in incorrectly spliced mRNA. Missense mutations of MEN1 are especially important as they result in a change to crucial amino acids needed in order to bind and interact with other proteins and molecules. As menin is located predominantly in the nucleus, these mutations can impact the stability of the cell and may further affect functional activity or expression levels of the protein. Studies have also shown that single amino acid changes in genes involved in oncogenic disorders may result in proteolytic degradation leading to loss of function and reduced stability of the mutant protein; a common mechanism for inactivating tumor suppressor gene products. MEN1 gene mutations and deletions also play a role in the development of hereditary and a subgroup of sporadic pituitary adenomas and were detected in approximately 5% of sporadic pituitary adenomas. Consequently, alterations of the gene represent a candidate pathogenetic mechanism of pituitary tumorigenesis especially when considered in terms of interactions with other proteins, growth factors, oncogenes play a rule in tumorigenesis.

Although the exact function of MEN1 is not known, the Knudson "two-hit" hypothesis provides strong evidence that it is a tumor suppressor gene. Familial loss of one copy of MEN1 is seen in association with MEN-1 syndrome. Tumor suppressor carcinogenesis follows Knudson's "two-hit" model. The first hit is a heterozygous MEN1 germline mutation either developed in an early embryonic stage and consequently present in all cells at birth for the sporadic cases, or inherited from one parent in a familial case. The second hit is a MEN1 somatic mutation, oftentimes a large deletion occurring in the predisposed endocrine cell and providing cells with the survival advantaged needed for tumor development. The MEN-1 syndrome often exhibits tumors of parathyroid glands, anterior pituitary, endocrine pancreas, and endocrine duodenum. Less frequently, neuroendocrine tumors of lung, thymus, and stomach or non-endocrine tumors such as lipomas, angiofibromas, and ependymomas are observed neoplasms.

In a study of 12 sporadic carcinoid tumors of the lung, five cases involved inactivation of both copies of the MEN1 gene. Of the five carcinoids, three were atypical and two were typical. The two typical carcinoids were characterized by a rapid proliferative rate with a higher mitotic index and stronger Ki67 positivity than the other typical carcinoids in the study. Consequently, the carcinoid tumors with MEN1 gene inactivation in the study were considered to be characterized by more aggressive molecular and histopathological features than those without MEN1 gene alterations.

=== Pharmaceuticals ===
Anticancer drugs that exert their pharmacological effect by interfering with menin's interactions include the approved drug revumenib and the experimental drugs bleximenib, enzomenib, icovamenib, and ziftomenib.

== Interactions ==
MEN1 has been shown to interact with:

- FANCD2,
- GFAP,
- JunD,
- NFKB1,
- MLL,
- RPA2, and
- VIM.
