= DOT1L =

Protein-coding gene in the species Homo sapiens

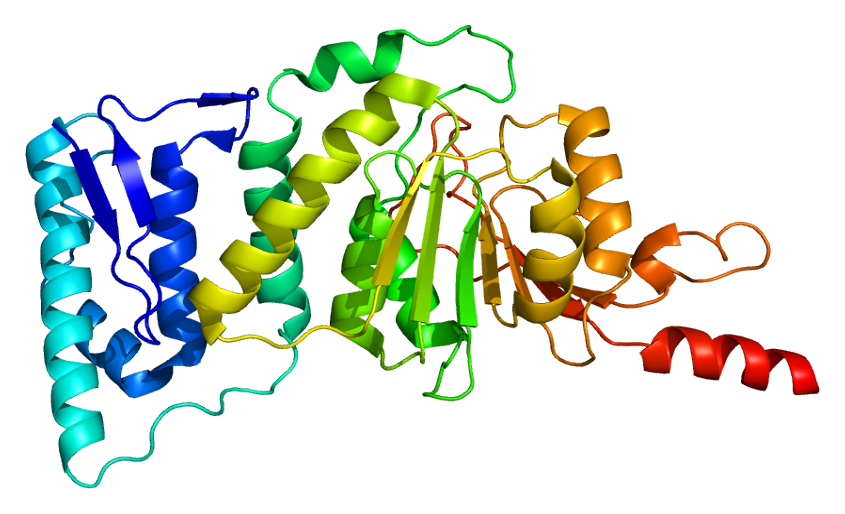

Identifiers
- Aliases: DOT1L, DOT1, KMT4, DOT1 like histone lysine methyltransferase
- External IDs: OMIM: 607375; MGI: 2143886; GeneCards: DOT1L
Available structures
PDB	Human UniProt search: PDBe RCSB
PDB	List of PDB id codes 1NW3, 2MV7, 3QOW, 3QOX, 3SR4, 3SX0, 3UWP, 4EK9, 4EKG, 4EKI, 4EQZ, 4ER0, 4ER3, 4ER5, 4ER6, 4ER7, 4HRA, 4WVL, 5DSX, 5JUW, 5DRT, 5DTM, 5DTQ, 5DT2, 5DRY, 5DTR
Enzyme activity
EC #	BRENDA	ExPASy	KEGG	MetaCyc
2.1.1.360	↗	↗	↗	↗

Gene location (Human)
Chr.	Chromosome 19 (human)
Band	19p13.3	Start	2,163,933 bp
Band	19p13.3	End	2,232,578 bp

Gene location (Mouse)
Chr.	Chromosome 10 (mouse)
Band	10|10 C1	Start	80,591,040 bp
Band	10|10 C1	End	80,631,295 bp
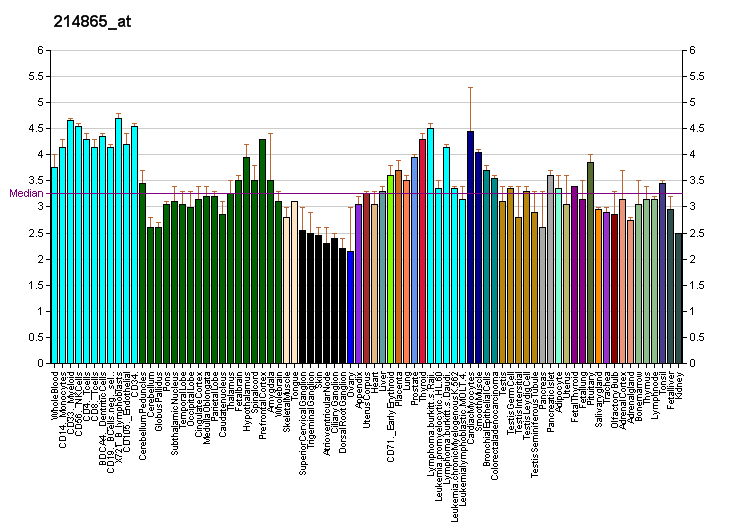
RNA expression pattern
Bgee	Human / Mouse (ortholog); Top expressed in: right testis; left testis; mucosa of ileum; ventricular zone; sural nerve; ganglionic eminence; sperm; right hemisphere of cerebellum; right lobe of thyroid gland; mucosa of transverse colon / Top expressed in: cerebellar cortex; zygote; hand; superior frontal gyrus; lobe of cerebellum; primary visual cortex; cerebellar vermis; muscle of thigh; genital tubercle; spermatid; More reference expression data
BioGPS	More reference expression data
Gene ontology
Molecular function	methyltransferase activity; transferase activity; DNA binding; transcription factor binding; protein binding; histone methyltransferase activity; histone-lysine N-methyltransferase activity; histone methyltransferase activity (H3-K79 specific)
Cellular component	nucleoplasm; nucleus; telomere; intracellular membrane-bounded organelle; protein-containing complex
Biological process	telomere organization; methylation; regulation of transcription regulatory region DNA binding; regulation of receptor signaling pathway via JAK-STAT; positive regulation of transcription by RNA polymerase II; positive regulation of cell population proliferation; histone H3-K79 methylation; DNA damage checkpoint signaling; DNA repair; chromatin organization; regulation of cell cycle
Sources:Amigo / QuickGO
Orthologs
Databases	NCBI: entry; OMA: entry
Species	Human	Mouse
Entrez	84444	208266
Ensembl	ENSG00000104885	ENSMUSG00000061589
UniProt	Q8TEK3	n/a
RefSeq (mRNA)	NM_032482	NM_199322
RefSeq (protein)	NP_115871	n/a
Location (UCSC)	Chr 19: 2.16 – 2.23 Mb	Chr 10: 80.59 – 80.63 Mb
PubMed search
- Wikidata
View/Edit Human	View/Edit Mouse

DOT1-like (Disruptor of telomeric silencing 1-like), histone H3K79 methyltransferase (S. cerevisiae), also known as DOT1L, is a protein found in humans, as well as other eukaryotes.

DOT1L has been reported to play an important role in the processes of mixed-lineage leukemia (MLL)-rearranged leukemias. DOT1L also plays a role in spermatogenesis, where it acts as a transcriptional activator for genes responsible for the histone-to-protamine transition.

Small molecule inhibitors of Dot1L catalytic activity have been developed.

All three forms of H3K79 methylation (H3K79me1; H3K79me2; H3K79me3) are catalyzed by DOT1 in yeast or DOT1L in mammals. H3K79 methylation participates in the DNA damage response and has multiple roles in nucleotide excision repair and sister chromatid recombinational repair.
