= MLLT3 =

Protein-coding gene in the species Homo sapiens

Identifiers
- Aliases: MLLT3, AF9, YEATS3, myeloid/lymphoid or mixed-lineage leukemia; translocated to, 3, super elongation complex subunit, MLLT3 super elongation complex subunit
- External IDs: OMIM: 159558; MGI: 1917372; GeneCards: MLLT3
Available structures
PDB	Ortholog search: PDBe RCSB
PDB	List of PDB id codes 2LM0, 2MV7, 4TMP, 2N4Q, 5HJB, 5HJD

Gene location (Human)
Chr.	Chromosome 9 (human)
Band	9p21.3	Start	20,341,669 bp
Band	9p21.3	End	20,622,499 bp

Gene location (Mouse)
Chr.	Chromosome 4 (mouse)
Band	4 C4|4 41.06 cM	Start	87,688,162 bp
Band	4 C4|4 41.06 cM	End	87,951,601 bp
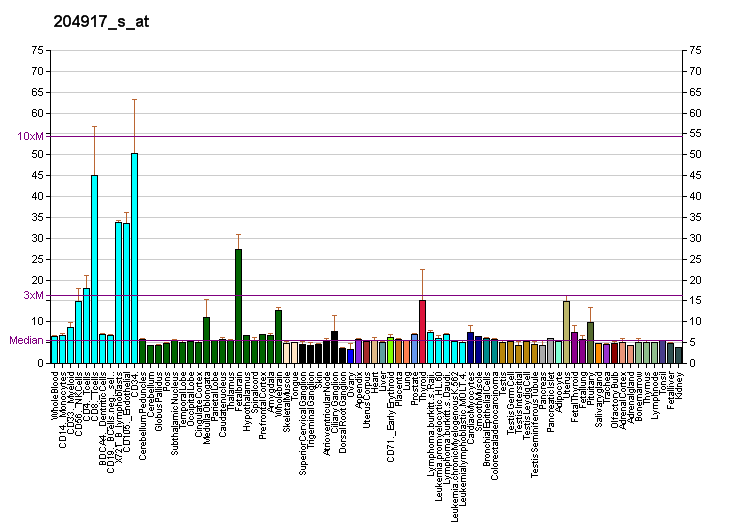

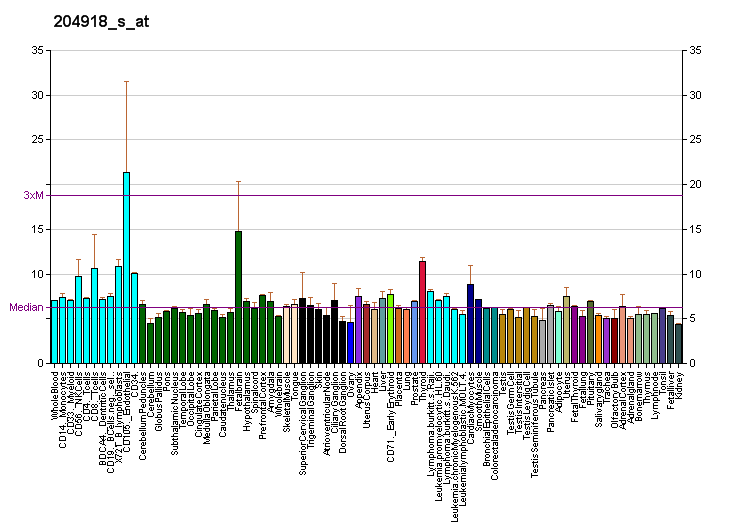
RNA expression pattern
Bgee	Human / Mouse (ortholog); Top expressed in: ganglionic eminence; rectum; Achilles tendon; epithelium of colon; endothelial cell; ventricular zone; buccal mucosa cell; testicle; mucosa of transverse colon; stromal cell of endometrium / Top expressed in: tail of embryo; genital tubercle; zygote; metatarsal bones; plantaris muscle; muscle of thigh; extensor digitorum longus muscle; intercostal muscle; Ileal epithelium; triceps brachii muscle; More reference expression data
BioGPS	More reference expression data
Gene ontology
Molecular function	protein binding; chromatin binding; histone binding; lysine-acetylated histone binding; modification-dependent protein binding; DNA-binding transcription factor activity, RNA polymerase II-specific
Cellular component	transcription elongation factor complex; extracellular exosome; nucleus; nucleoplasm; chromosome
Biological process	positive regulation of Wnt signaling pathway, planar cell polarity pathway; regulation of transcription, DNA-templated; negative regulation of canonical Wnt signaling pathway; transcription, DNA-templated; segment specification; anterior/posterior pattern specification; transcription by RNA polymerase II; transcription elongation from RNA polymerase II promoter; positive regulation of transcription, DNA-templated; regulation of transcription by RNA polymerase II
Sources:Amigo / QuickGO
Orthologs
Databases	NCBI: entry; OMA: entry
Species	Human	Mouse
Entrez	4300	70122
Ensembl	ENSG00000171843	ENSMUSG00000028496
UniProt	P42568	A2AM29
RefSeq (mRNA)	NM_004529; NM_001286691	NM_001286158; NM_027326; NM_029931
RefSeq (protein)	NP_001273620; NP_004520	NP_001273087; NP_081602; NP_084207; NP_001391884; NP_001391885 NP_001391886; NP_001391887
Location (UCSC)	Chr 9: 20.34 – 20.62 Mb	Chr 4: 87.69 – 87.95 Mb
PubMed search
- Wikidata
View/Edit Human	View/Edit Mouse

Protein AF-9 is a protein that in humans is encoded by the MLLT3 gene.

== Interactions ==
MLLT3 has been shown to interact with BCOR.
