= Israel Hanukoglu =

Israeli biochemist

- ישראל חנוקוגלו
- Born: Istanbul, Turkey
- Education: Hebrew University of Jerusalem
- Known for: Keratin structure, steroidogenic enzymes, epithelial sodium channels
- Awards: Lindner Prize
- Scientific career
- Fields: Biochemistry, molecular biology
- Workplaces: Ariel University
- Thesis: Mechanism of electron transport to cytochrome P-450 in adrenal cortex mitochondrial monooxygenase systems (1980)
- Doctoral advisor: Colin Jefcoate
- Other academic advisors: Neal L. First, David Nelson, W.W. Cleland

Israel Hanukoglu (Turkish: İsrael Hanukoğlu, Hebrew: ישראל חנוקוגלו) is a Turkish-born Israeli scientist. He is a full professor of biochemistry and molecular biology at Ariel University and former science and technology adviser to the prime minister of Israel (1996–1999). He is founder of Israel Science and Technology Directory.

== Education ==
=== Elementary and high school education ===
Israel Hanukoglu attended tr:Şişli Terakki Lisesi in Istanbul until the end of junior high school. In ninth grade, he switched to Atatürk Erkek Lisesi in Taksim, Istanbul, graduating in 1969. In his senior year, he was selected for an American Field Service (AFS) International Scholarship. As an AFS student, he attended Joseph A. Craig High School in Janesville, Wisconsin, and received his high-school diploma in 1970.

=== College education ===
Israel Hanukoglu received his undergraduate degree cum laude with double majors in biology and psychology and a minor in political science from the Hebrew University of Jerusalem. He then went to the University of Wisconsin–Madison for graduate studies and received his M.Sc. degree in 1976 in an inter-disciplinary Endocrinology-Reproductive physiology program, under the joint supervision of Prof. Harry J. Karavolas (Dept. of Physiological Chemistry) and Prof. Robert W. Goy (Dept. of Psychology). His Ph.D. thesis research on the "Mechanism of electron transport to cytochrome P-450 in adrenal cortex mitochondrial steroid monooxygenase systems" was carried out under the supervision of Prof. Colin R. Jefcoate. He received his Ph.D. diploma in August 1980.

== Contributions to science ==
Prof. Hanukoglu's scientific work concentrated in three different areas outlined below.

=== Structures of keratins ===
Hanukoglu's career in molecular biology started at the Department of Biochemistry of the University of Chicago (1980–1983 with Elaine Fuchs), where he cloned and sequenced cDNAs coding for cytoskeletal proteins, actin and alpha keratins. He elucidated the first structures of cytoskeletal keratin families, and predicted the long helical domains of these proteins. By computerized analysis of amino acid sequences he predicted that the central rod domain of intermediate filament proteins is composed of four helical segments separated by three short linker sequences. Later crystallographic studies have confirmed this as a general model for intermediate filament protein structure.

=== Steroid hormone synthesis ===
During his Ph.D. thesis research, Israel isolated the mitochondrial enzymes that catalyze the first step in the synthesis of steroid hormones in all steroidogenic tissues, including the adrenal cortex, and the reproductive organs. The first step of steroidogenesis is dependent on the transfer of electrons from NADPH to a P450 type enzyme (P450scc) via an electron-transfer chain that includes two additional proteins. These proteins are located on the inner mitochondrial membrane. Israel reconstituted this system using proteins he purified, characterized the process of electron transfer between the proteins, and built a kinetic model that simulated precisely the dynamic behavior of this complex system.

In his first academic position at the Department of Biology at the Technion-Israel Institute of Technology, he first determined the molar stoichiometry of the mitochondrial P450 system proteins using specific antibodies that he generated. He then set out to clone the cDNAs and the genes that code for these enzymes. His lab was the first to clone the cDNAs and the gene coding for adrenodoxin reductase - the first enzyme in the electron transfer chain of the mitochondrial P450 system.

By sequence and structural analyses of adrenodoxin reductase, Israel identified its binding sites for the electron donor and acceptor coenzymes, NADPH and FAD. By sequence analyses of the large oxidoreductase type of enzyme families, he noted that the FAD-binding site is a classical Rossmann fold, but the NADPH binding site has a different consensus sequence that could be responsible for NAD vs. NADP coenzyme specificity. The importance of the motifs he identified was confirmed by re-engineering of coenzyme specificities of different enzymes. Elucidation of the crystal structure of adrenodoxin reductase further verified Israel's identification of the coenzyme binding sites. Analysis of the phylogeny of this enzyme in eukaryotes showed that the NADP binding site sequence is strictly conserved.

As the steroidogenic tissues have very high levels of antioxidants, Israel suspected that the P450 systems may leak electrons producing oxygen radicals. He examined this issue and showed that indeed, electrons that leak during the action mitochondrial P450 systems generate reactive oxygen species. His studies also showed that in bovine ovary, levels of antioxidants are coordinately regulated with steroidogenesis.

His other work in this field includes elucidation of the mechanism of action of corticotropin (ACTH) in regulating steroid hormone synthesis in the adrenal cortex, regulation of adrenal steroidogenic capacity in disease states, and the cloning and elucidation of the structure of ACTH receptor.

In this field, Israel organized the first International Symposium in Molecular Steroidogenesis in Jerusalem in 1991 which served as the cornerstone for a continuing series of international symposia for scientists who specialize in this field.

=== Epithelial sodium channel (ENaC) ===
In his clinical work as an endocrinologist, Israel's older brother, Prof. Aaron Hanukoglu (Tel Aviv University, Sackler Medical School and E. Wolfson Medical Center), identified that a hereditary disease named pseudohypoaldosteronism (PHA) type I encompasses two independent syndromes. Following this discovery the two brothers continued their collaboration to understand the molecular basis of the severe form of PHA.

By their collaborative work that also included additional labs, the Hanukoglu brothers discovered that the severe forms of pseudohypoaldosteronism type I result from mutations in three genes (SCNN1A, SCNN1B, and SCNN1B) that encode for protein subunits of the Epithelial sodium (Na^{+}) channel (ENaC). These studies also helped establish that ENaC is the principal channel involved in blood volume and blood pressure regulation in humans.

Following these studies, the Hanukoglu brothers directed their attention to understand the structure and function of ENaC assembled from normal and mutated subunits. Their analyses showed that the phenotypic variations in the severity of pseudohypoaldosteronism are associated with the types of genetic mutations. Their work on the structure of ENaC subunits led to the identification of charged residues and regions responsible for transport of the protein to membrane and for regulation of extracellular Na^{+} ions.

In an extensive review of studies on ASIC and ENaC, Prof. Hanukoglu has summarized the major similarities between ASIC and ENaC type channels.

To define the sites of localization of ENaC in tissues and within cells, Hanukoglu's laboratory generated polyclonal antibodies against extracellular ENaC subunits. These antibodies for the first time permitted visualization of intracellular localization of ENaC at high resolution and led to the discovery that in all cells with motile cilia ENaC is located on cilia. These studies establish that ENaC is an important regulator of fluid level in the luminal side of cells with motile cilia in the female reproductive and respiratory tract. More recently, they showed that these sodium channels are also located in the seminiferous tubules in the testis and in the tail and head region of sperm.

Systemic pseudohypoaldosteronism patients with mutated ENaC subunits may lose significant amount salt in sweat especially at hot climates. To identify the sites of salt loss, Hanukoglu brothers examined the localization of ENaC in the human skin. In a comprehensive study examining all the layers of skin and epidermal appendages, they found a widespread distribution of ENaC in keratinocytes in the epidermal layers. Yet, in the eccrine sweat glands, ENaC was localized on the apical cell membrane exposed to the duct of these sweat glands. Based on additional observations, they concluded that the ENaC located on the eccrine gland sweat ducts is responsible for the uptake of Na^{+} ions from sweat secretions. This recycling of Na^{+} reduces the concentration of salt in perspiration and prevents the loss of salt at hot climates via perspiration.

== Awards ==
- American Field Service International Scholarship (from Turkey to the USA) (1969).
- Ford Foundation Fellowship in Endocrinology (1975).
- Damon Runyon Cancer Research Foundation Fellowship Award in Biochemistry (1981).
- National Cancer Institute, National Research Service Award for Postdoctoral Fellowship in Biochemistry (1982).
- Technion V.P.R. Fund-Henri Gutwirth Award for Excellence in Research (1984).
- Delta Research Career Development Award at Weizmann Institute of Science (1987).
- The first Hans Lindner Prize in Endocrinology, Israel Endocrine Society (1988).
- Lubell Prize for the outstanding young scientist at the Weizmann Institute of Science (1991).
- 2016 Sentinel of Science Award for peer review in Biochemistry, Genetics and Molecular Biology by Publons (1st place among Israeli Scientists)
- 2018 Publons Peer Review Award. Ranked in the top 1% of reviewers in "Molecular Biology and Genetics". Global rank: 22nd

In addition to the personal prizes above, the research presentations from the laboratory of Prof. Hanukoglu received four awards at national and international meetings.

== Academic and civic activities ==
Besides a scientific career, Hanukoglu has maintained an active academic and civic leadership role. In 2003, Hanukoglu founded Israel's first B.Sc. degree program in Molecular Biology at the Ariel University Center. He served as the Chairman of the Molecular Biology Department from 2003 to 2008.

Hanukoglu has been an editorial board member/Associate editor in five journals, including Biochemistry and Molecular Biology Education, BMC Biotechnology, Cells, Frontiers in Renal and Epithelial Physiology, and Gene. In 2018, he received Publons Peer Review Award for placing in the top 1% of reviewers in "Molecular Biology and Genetics" with a global rank of 22nd.

In 1995, Hanukoglu was elected as the Chairman of the Professors for a Strong Israel, a self-described "non-partisan organization of academics united by a shared concern for the security and the Jewish character of the State of Israel." From 1996 to 1999 he served as the science adviser to the prime minister of Israel Benjamin Netanyahu. Hanukoglu was placed as an honorary candidate on the Herut – The National Movement list.

In 2003 he was appointed as the scientific advisor to the mayor of Rishon LeZion for establishing the Jewish Nobel Laureates Boulevard. For 12 years (1996–2008), he served as a founding member of the Ariel Center for Policy Research executive board.

== Obama birth certificate controversy ==
Hanukoglu's website, the Israel Science and Technology Homepage, had included a page captioned, "Long-Form Birth Certificate of Obama is a Forged Document." The analyses presented asserted that "without a doubt that the Long-Form Birth Certificate of Mr. Obama is a fabricated, fake and forged document."
