= SCNN1G =

Protein-coding gene in the species Homo sapiens

Identifiers
- Aliases: SCNN1G, BESC3, ENaCg, ENaCgamma, PHA1, SCNEG, sodium channel epithelial 1 gamma subunit, LDLS2, sodium channel epithelial 1 subunit gamma
- External IDs: OMIM: 600761; MGI: 104695; GeneCards: SCNN1G

Gene location (Human)
Chr.	Chromosome 16 (human)
Band	16p12.2	Start	23,182,745 bp
Band	16p12.2	End	23,216,883 bp

Gene location (Mouse)
Chr.	Chromosome 7 (mouse)
Band	7 F2|7 65.07 cM	Start	121,333,702 bp
Band	7 F2|7 65.07 cM	End	121,367,698 bp
RNA expression pattern
Bgee	Human / Mouse (ortholog); Top expressed in: renal medulla; bronchial epithelial cell; human kidney; mucosa of paranasal sinus; lower lobe of lung; salivary gland; minor salivary glands; parotid gland; skin of leg; upper lobe of lung / Top expressed in: right lung lobe; left lung; transitional epithelium of urinary bladder; vestibular membrane of cochlear duct; left lung lobe; right kidney; medullary collecting duct; renal pelvis; connecting tubule; human kidney; More reference expression data
BioGPS	n/a
Gene ontology
Molecular function	sodium channel activity; ion channel activity; protein binding; WW domain binding; ligand-gated sodium channel activity
Cellular component	integral component of membrane; membrane; sodium channel complex; integral component of plasma membrane; apical plasma membrane; extracellular exosome; external side of plasma membrane; nucleoplasm; plasma membrane
Biological process	excretion; sodium ion transmembrane transport; response to stimulus; sodium ion transport; ion transport; sodium ion homeostasis; multicellular organismal water homeostasis; sensory perception of taste; ion transmembrane transport
Sources:Amigo / QuickGO
Orthologs
Databases	NCBI: entry; OMA: entry
Species	Human	Mouse
Entrez	6340	20278
Ensembl	ENSG00000166828	ENSMUSG00000000216
UniProt	P51170	Q9WU39
RefSeq (mRNA)	NM_001039	NM_011326
RefSeq (protein)	NP_001030	NP_035456
Location (UCSC)	Chr 16: 23.18 – 23.22 Mb	Chr 7: 121.33 – 121.37 Mb
PubMed search
- Wikidata
View/Edit Human	View/Edit Mouse

The SCNN1G gene encodes for the γ subunit of the epithelial sodium channel ENaC in vertebrates. ENaC is assembled as a heterotrimer composed of three homologous subunits α, β, and γ or δ, β, and γ. The other ENaC subunits are encoded by SCNN1A, SCNN1B, and SCNN1D.

ENaC is expressed in epithelial cells and is different from the voltage-gated sodium channel that is involved in the generation of action potentials in neurons. The abbreviation for the genes encoding for voltage-gated sodium channel starts with three letters: SCN. In contrast to these sodium channels, ENaC is constitutively active and is not voltage-dependent. The second N in the abbreviation (SCNN1) represents that these are NON-voltage-gated channels.

In most vertebrates, sodium ions are the major determinant of the osmolarity of the extracellular fluid. ENaC allows transfer of sodium ions across the epithelial cell membrane in so-called "tight-epithelia" that have low permeability. The flow of sodium ions across epithelia affects osmolarity of the extracellular fluid. Thus, ENaC plays a central role in the regulation of body fluid and electrolyte homeostasis and consequently affects blood pressure.

As ENaC is strongly inhibited by amiloride, it is also referred to as an "amiloride-sensitive sodium channel".

== History ==
The first cDNA encoding the gamma subunit of ENaC was cloned and sequenced by Canessa et al. from rat mRNA. A year later, two independent groups reported the cDNA sequences of the beta- and gamma-subunits of the human ENaC. The complete coding sequence human γ subunit was reported by Saxena et al.

== Gene structure ==
While the human gene SCNN1A is located in chromosome 12p, the human genes encoding SCNN1B and SCNN1G are located in juxtaposition in the short arm of chromosome 16 (16p12-p13). The structures of the human and rat SCNN1G genes were first reported by Thomas et al. Later studies by Saxena et al. reported the complete coding sequence of the human SCNN1G gene establishing that it has 13 exons The positions of introns are conserved in all three human ENaC genes, SCNN1A, SCNN1B and SCNN1G. The positions of the introns are also highly conserved across vertebrates See: Ensembl GeneTree.

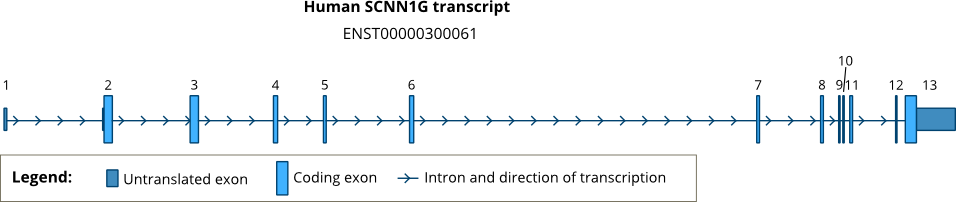
Fig. 1. Exon-intron structure of the major transcript of the human SCNN1B. The number of each exon is marked above the exon. The serial number of the transcript is shown above the transcript. Clicking on the figure will direct the reader to the list of transcripts in the Ensembl database.

== Tissue-specific expression ==
The three ENaC subunits encoded by SCNN1A, SCNN1B, and SCNN1G are commonly expressed in tight epithelia that have low water permeability. The major organs where ENaC is expressed include parts of the kidney tubular epithelia, the respiratory airway, the female reproductive tract, colon, salivary and sweat glands.

ENaC is also expressed in the tongue, where it has been shown to be essential for the perception of salt taste.

The expression of ENaC subunit genes is regulated mainly by the mineralocorticoid hormone aldosterone that is activated by the renin-angiotensin system.

== Protein structure ==
The primary structures of all four ENaC subunits show strong similarity. Thus, these four proteins represent a family of proteins that share a common ancestor. In global alignment (meaning alignments of sequences along their entire length and not just a partial segment), the human γ subunit shares 34% identity with the β subunit and 27 and 23% identity with the α and δ subunits.

All four ENaC subunit sequences have two hydrophobic stretches that form two transmembrane segments named as TM1 and TM2. In the membrane-bound form, the TM segments are embedded in the membrane bilayer, the amino- and carboxy-terminal regions are located inside the cell, and the segment between the two TMs remains outside of the cell as the extracellular region of ENaC. This extracellular region includes about 70% of the residues of each subunit. Thus, in the membrane-bound form, the bulk of each subunit is located outside of the cell.

The structure of ENaC has not been yet determined. Yet, the structure of a homologous protein ASIC1 has been resolved. The chicken ASIC1 structure revealed that ASIC1 is assembled as a homotrimer of three identical subunits. The authors of the original study suggested that the ASIC1 trimer resembles a hand holding a ball. Hence distinct domains of ASIC1 have been referred to as palm, knuckle, finger, thumb, and β-ball.

Site-directed mutagenesis of the human γ subunit suggests that ENaC subunits have a structure similar to that of ASIC1. The ion selectivity filter of ENaC has been modeled based on the ASIC1 structure.

Alignment of ENaC subunit sequences with ASIC1 sequence reveals that TM1 and TM2 segments and palm domain are conserved, and the knuckle, finger and thumb domains have insertions in ENaC. Site-directed mutagenesis studies on ENaC subunits provide evidence that many basic features of the ASIC1 structural model apply to ENaC as well.

In the carboxy terminus of three ENaC subunits, (α, β and γ) there is a special conserved consensus sequence PPPXYXXL that is called the PY motif. This sequence is recognized by the so-called WW domains in a special E3 ubiquitin-protein ligase named Nedd4-2. Nedd4-2 ligates ubiquitin to the C-terminus of the ENaC subunit which marks the protein for degradation.

== Associated diseases ==
At present, three major hereditary disorders are known to be associated with mutations in the SCNN1G gene. These are: 1. Multisystem pseudohypoaldosteronism, 2. Liddle syndrome, and 3. Cystic fibrosis-like disease.

=== Multi-system form of type I pseudohypoaldosteronism (PHA1B) ===
The disease most commonly associated with mutations in SCNN1B is the multi-system form of type I pseudohypoaldosteronism (PHA1B) that was first characterized by A. Hanukoglu as an autosomal recessive disease. This is a syndrome of unresponsiveness to aldosterone in patients that have high serum levels of aldosterone but suffer from symptoms of aldosterone deficiency with a high risk of mortality due to severe salt loss. Initially, this disease was thought to be a result of a mutation in the mineralocorticoid receptor (NR3C2) that binds aldosterone. But homozygosity mapping in 11 affected families revealed that the disease is associated with two loci on chromosome 12p13.1-pter and chromosome 16p12.2-13 that include the genes for SCNN1A and SCNN1B and SCNN1G respectively. Sequencing of the ENaC genes identified mutation in affected patients, and functional expression of the mutated cDNAs further confirmed that identified mutations lead to the loss of activity of ENaC.

In the majority of the patients with multi-system PHA1B a homozygous mutation or two compound heterozygous mutations have been detected.

=== Liddle syndrome ===
Liddle syndrome is generally caused by mutations in the PY motif or truncation of the C-terminus including loss of the PY motif in the β or γ ENaC subunits. Even though there is a PY motif also in the α subunit, so far Liddle disease has not observed in association with a mutation in the α subunit. Liddle syndrome is inherited as an autosomal dominant disease with a phenotype that includes early onset hypertension, metabolic alkalosis and low levels of plasma renin activity and mineralocorticoid hormone aldosterone. In the absence of a recognizable PY motif, ubiquitin-protein ligase Nedd4-2 cannot bind to the ENaC subunit and hence cannot attach a ubiquitin to it. Consequently, proteolysis of ENaC by proteasome is inhibited and ENaC accumulates in the membrane leading to enhanced activity of ENaC that causes hypertension.

== Interactions ==
SCNN1G has been shown to interact with:

- NEDD4,
- STX1A, and
- Ubiquitin C

== See also ==
- Epithelial sodium channel
