= Epithelial sodium channel blocker =

Amiloride

Triamterene

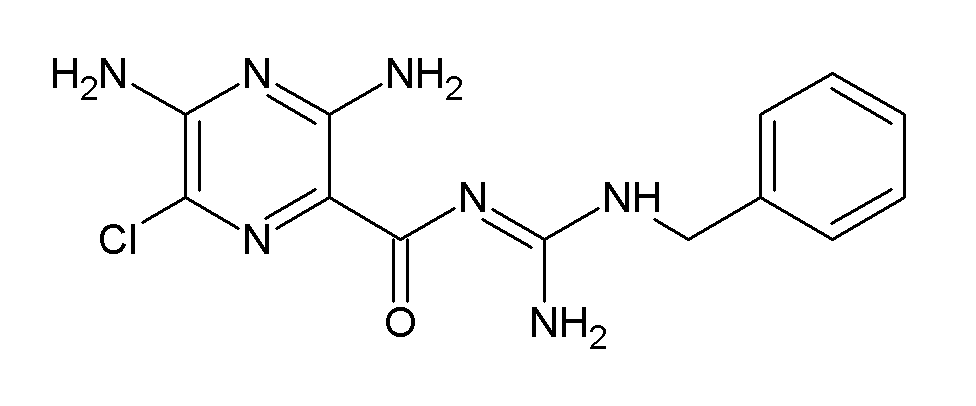
Benzamil

An epithelial sodium channel blocker is a sodium channel blocker that is selective for the epithelial sodium channel.

An example is amiloride, which is used in the treatment of hypertension.
