= SCNN1D =

Protein-coding gene in humans

Identifiers
- Aliases: SCNN1D, ENaCd, ENaCdelta, SCNED, dNaCh, sodium channel epithelial 1 delta subunit, sodium channel epithelial 1 subunit delta
- External IDs: OMIM: 601328; GeneCards: SCNN1D

Gene location (Human)
Chr.	Chromosome 1 (human)
Band	1p36.33	Start	1,280,436 bp
Band	1p36.33	End	1,292,029 bp
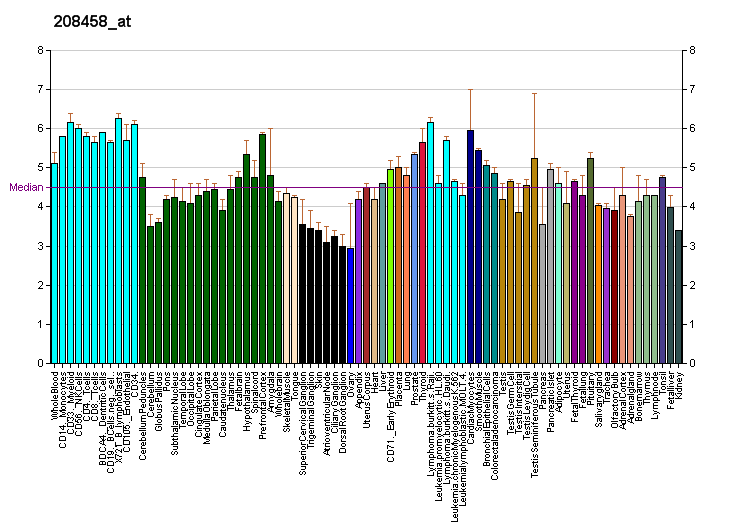
RNA expression pattern
Bgee	Human / Mouse (ortholog); Top expressed in: right hemisphere of cerebellum; right testis; left testis; right uterine tube; right frontal lobe; apex of heart; anterior pituitary; left ovary; right ovary; cingulate gyrus / n/a; More reference expression data
BioGPS	More reference expression data
Gene ontology
Molecular function	ligand-gated sodium channel activity; sodium channel activity; protein binding
Cellular component	integral component of membrane; plasma membrane; membrane; actin cytoskeleton
Biological process	ion transport; sensory perception of taste; response to stimulus; sodium ion transport; sodium ion transmembrane transport; ion transmembrane transport
Sources:Amigo / QuickGO
Orthologs
Databases	NCBI: entry; OMA: entry
Species	Human	Mouse
Entrez	6339	n/a
Ensembl	ENSG00000162572	n/a
UniProt	P51172	n/a
RefSeq (mRNA)	NM_001130413; NM_002978	n/a
RefSeq (protein)	NP_001123885	n/a
Location (UCSC)	Chr 1: 1.28 – 1.29 Mb	n/a
PubMed search		n/a
- Wikidata
View/Edit Human

The SCNN1D gene encodes for the δ (delta) subunit of the epithelial sodium channel ENaC in vertebrates. ENaC is assembled as a heterotrimer composed of three homologous subunits α, β, and γ or δ, β, and γ. The other ENaC subunits are encoded by SCNN1A, SCNN1B, and SCNN1G.

ENaC is expressed in epithelial cells and is different from the voltage-gated sodium channel that is involved in the generation of action potentials in neurons. The abbreviation for the genes encoding for voltage-gated sodium channel starts with three letters: SCN. In contrast to these sodium channels, ENaC is constitutively active and is not voltage-dependent. The second N in the abbreviation (SCNN1D) represents that these are NON-voltage-gated channels.

In most vertebrates, sodium ions are the major determinant of the osmolarity of the extracellular fluid. ENaC allows transfer of sodium ions across the epithelial cell membrane in so-called "tight-epithelia" that have low permeability. The flow of sodium ions across epithelia affects osmolarity of the extracellular fluid. Thus, ENaC plays a central role in the regulation of body fluid and electrolyte homeostasis and consequently affects blood pressure.

As ENaC is strongly inhibited by amiloride, it is also referred to as an "amiloride-sensitive sodium channel".

== History ==
The first cDNA encoding the delta subunit of ENaC was cloned and sequenced by Waldmann et al. from human kidney mRNA.

== Gene structure ==
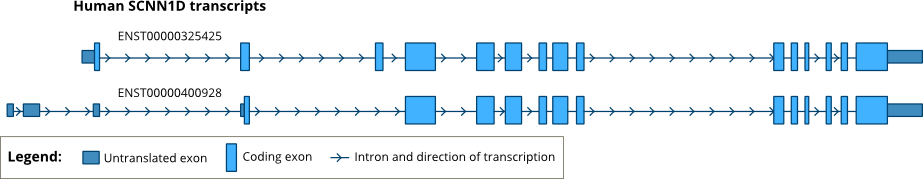
Exon-intron structure of the major transcript of human SCNN1D. The serial number of each transcript is shown above the transcript. Clicking on the figure will direct the reader to the list of transcripts in the Ensembl database.

The sequence of the SCNN1D gene was first revealed by the Human Genome Project. SCNN1D is located in the short arm of chromosome 1 (Ensembl database code: ENSG00000162572) and starts at nucleotide 1,280,436 on the forward strand. Its length is about 11,583 bp. The gene encodes several alternative transcripts with different transcription and translation initiation sites. In mRNA samples from human brain, alternative splicing products have been detected, cloned and characterized. The SCNN1D gene is found in most vertebrates, but the gene has been lost in the mouse and rat genomes.

== Tissue-specific expression ==
The tissue specific expression of the δ-subunit is very different from that of the other three subunits encoded by SCNN1A, SCNN1B, and SCNN1G. While the α, β, and γ subunits are expressed mainly in the kidney tubular epithelia, the respiratory airway, the female reproductive tract, colon, salivary and sweat glands, the δ-subunit is expressed mainly in the brain, pancreas, testis and ovary.

== Protein structure ==
The primary structures of all four ENaC subunits show strong similarity. Thus, these four proteins represent a family of proteins that share a common ancestor. In global alignment (meaning alignments of sequences along their entire length and not just a partial segment), the human δ subunit shares 34% identity with the α subunit and 23% identity with the β and γ subunits.

All four ENaC subunit sequences have two hydrophobic stretches that form two transmembrane segments named as TM1 and TM2. In the membrane-bound form, the TM segments are embedded in the membrane bilayer, the amino- and carboxy-terminal regions are located inside the cell, and the segment between the two TMs remains outside of the cell as the extracellular region of ENaC. This extracellular region includes about 70% of the residues of each subunit. Thus, in the membrane-bound form, the bulk of each subunit is located outside of the cell.

The structure of ENaC has not been yet determined. Yet, the structure of a homologous protein ASIC1 has been resolved. The chicken ASIC1 structure revealed that ASIC1 is assembled as a homotrimer of three identical subunits. The authors of the original study suggested that the ASIC1 trimer resembles a hand holding a ball. Hence distinct domains of ASIC1 have been referred to as palm, knuckle, finger, thumb, and β-ball.

Alignment of ENaC subunit sequences with ASIC1 sequence reveals that TM1 and TM2 segments and palm domain are conserved, and the knuckle, finger and thumb domains have insertions in ENaC. Site-directed mutagenesis studies on ENaC subunits provide evidence that many basic features of the ASIC1 structural model apply to ENaC as well. Yet, ENaC is an obligate heterotrimer composed of three subunits as an αβγ or a βγδ trimer.

== Associated diseases ==
So far mutations in the delta subunit have not been associated with a specific disease.
