= PMEPA1 =

Protein-coding gene in humans

Identifiers
- Aliases: PMEPA1, STAG1, TMEPAI, prostate transmembrane protein, androgen induced 1
- External IDs: OMIM: 606564; MGI: 1929600; GeneCards: PMEPA1

Gene location (Human)
Chr.	Chromosome 20 (human)
Band	20q13.31	Start	57,648,392 bp
Band	20q13.31	End	57,711,536 bp

Gene location (Mouse)
Chr.	Chromosome 2 (mouse)
Band	2|2 H3	Start	173,066,251 bp
Band	2|2 H3	End	173,118,326 bp
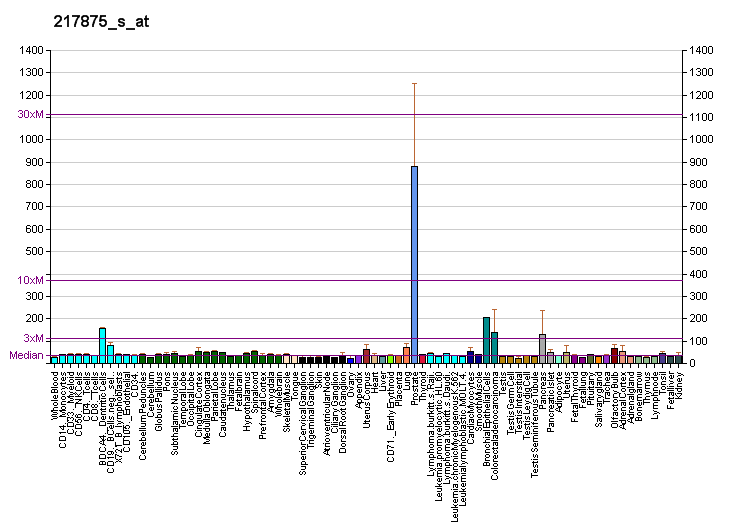
RNA expression pattern
Bgee	Human / Mouse (ortholog); Top expressed in: visceral pleura; ascending aorta; Descending thoracic aorta; popliteal artery; tibial arteries; tibia; tendon of biceps brachii; canal of the cervix; urethra; prostate / Top expressed in: ascending aorta; aortic valve; external carotid artery; internal carotid artery; tunica media of zone of aorta; brown adipose tissue; subcutaneous adipose tissue; interventricular septum; white adipose tissue; sciatic nerve; More reference expression data
BioGPS	More reference expression data
Gene ontology
Molecular function	WW domain binding; R-SMAD binding; protein binding
Cellular component	integral component of membrane; Golgi membrane; endosome; plasma membrane; Golgi apparatus; early endosome membrane; endosome membrane; intracellular membrane-bounded organelle; membrane
Biological process	androgen receptor signaling pathway; negative regulation of signal transduction; negative regulation of transforming growth factor beta receptor signaling pathway; negative regulation of pathway-restricted SMAD protein phosphorylation; negative regulation of SMAD protein complex assembly
Sources:Amigo / QuickGO
Orthologs
Databases	NCBI: entry; OMA: entry
Species	Human	Mouse
Entrez	56937	65112
Ensembl	ENSG00000124225	ENSMUSG00000038400
UniProt	Q969W9	Q9D7R2
RefSeq (mRNA)	NM_199171; NM_001255976; NM_020182; NM_199169; NM_199170	NM_022995
RefSeq (protein)	NP_001242905; NP_064567; NP_954638; NP_954639; NP_954640	n/a
Location (UCSC)	Chr 20: 57.65 – 57.71 Mb	Chr 2: 173.07 – 173.12 Mb
PubMed search
- Wikidata
View/Edit Human	View/Edit Mouse

Prostate transmembrane protein, androgen induced 1 is a protein that in humans is encoded by the PMEPA1 gene (previously TMEPAI). This protein functions to inhibit both TGF-beta signaling and the androgen receptor.

== Interactions ==
PMEPA1 has been shown to interact with NEDD4, and in particular probably inhibits the androgen receptor by recruiting NEDD4.
