= SCNN1B =

Protein-coding gene in the species Homo sapiens

Identifiers
- Aliases: SCNN1B, BESC1, ENaCb, ENaCbeta, SCNEB, sodium channel epithelial 1 beta subunit, LIDLS1, sodium channel epithelial 1 subunit beta
- External IDs: OMIM: 600760; MGI: 104696; GeneCards: SCNN1B

Gene location (Human)
Chr.	Chromosome 16 (human)
Band	16p12.2	Start	23,278,231 bp
Band	16p12.2	End	23,381,294 bp

Gene location (Mouse)
Chr.	Chromosome 7 (mouse)
Band	7 F2|7 65.07 cM	Start	121,464,261 bp
Band	7 F2|7 65.07 cM	End	121,517,737 bp
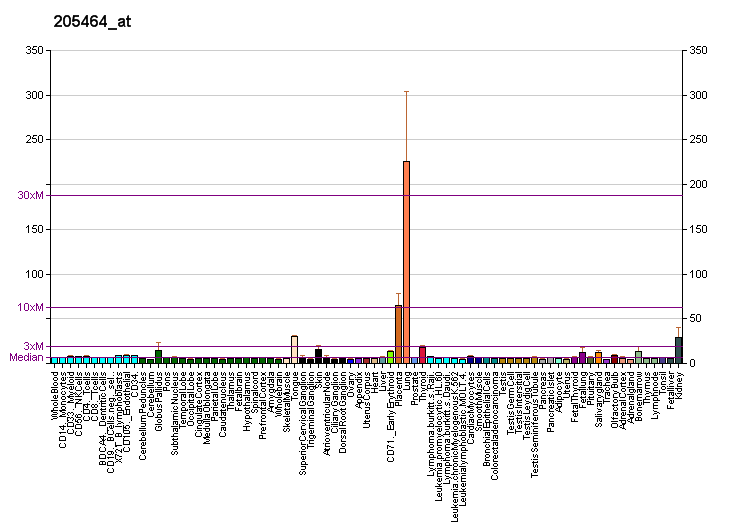
RNA expression pattern
Bgee	Human / Mouse (ortholog); Top expressed in: rectum; transverse colon; olfactory zone of nasal mucosa; skin of abdomen; skin of leg; right lung; minor salivary glands; upper lobe of left lung; vagina; mucosa of transverse colon / Top expressed in: vestibular membrane of cochlear duct; submandibular gland; right lung; right lung lobe; right kidney; islet of Langerhans; decidua; medullary collecting duct; left lung; inner renal medulla; More reference expression data
BioGPS	More reference expression data
Gene ontology
Molecular function	sodium channel activity; protein binding; WW domain binding; ligand-gated sodium channel activity
Cellular component	integral component of membrane; membrane; sodium channel complex; plasma membrane; integral component of plasma membrane; apical plasma membrane; extracellular exosome; cytoplasmic vesicle membrane; external side of plasma membrane; cytoplasmic vesicle
Biological process	excretion; sodium ion transmembrane transport; response to stimulus; sodium ion transport; ion transport; sodium ion homeostasis; multicellular organismal water homeostasis; sensory perception of taste; ion transmembrane transport
Sources:Amigo / QuickGO
Orthologs
Databases	NCBI: entry; OMA: entry
Species	Human	Mouse
Entrez	6338	20277
Ensembl	ENSG00000168447	ENSMUSG00000030873
UniProt	P51168	Q9WU38
RefSeq (mRNA)	NM_000336	NM_001272023; NM_011325
RefSeq (protein)	NP_000327	NP_001258952; NP_035455
Location (UCSC)	Chr 16: 23.28 – 23.38 Mb	Chr 7: 121.46 – 121.52 Mb
PubMed search
- Wikidata
View/Edit Human	View/Edit Mouse

The SCNN1B gene encodes for the β subunit of the epithelial sodium channel ENaC in vertebrates. ENaC is assembled as a heterotrimer composed of three homologous subunits α, β, and γ or δ, β, and γ. The other ENaC subunits are encoded by SCNN1A, SCNN1G, and SCNN1D.

ENaC is expressed in epithelial cells and is different from the voltage-gated sodium channel that is involved in the generation of action potentials in neurons. The abbreviation for the genes encoding for voltage-gated sodium channel starts with three letters: SCN. In contrast to these sodium channels, ENaC is constitutively active and is not voltage-dependent. The second N in the abbreviation (SCNN1A) represents that these are NON-voltage-gated channels.

In most vertebrates, sodium ions are the major determinant of the osmolarity of the extracellular fluid. ENaC allows transfer of sodium ions across the epithelial cell membrane in so-called "tight-epithelia" that have low permeability. The flow of sodium ions across epithelia affects osmolarity of the extracellular fluid. Thus, ENaC plays a central role in the regulation of body fluid and electrolyte homeostasis and consequently affects blood pressure.

As ENaC is strongly inhibited by amiloride, it is also referred to as an "amiloride-sensitive sodium channel".

== History ==
The first cDNA encoding the beta subunit of ENaC was cloned and sequenced by Canessa et al. from rat mRNA. A year later, two independent groups reported the cDNA sequences of the beta- and gamma-subunits of the human ENaC. The exon-intron organization of the human beta ENaC gene SCNN1B was determined by Saxena et al. by sequencing genomic DNA from three subjects from three different ethnic groups. This study also established that the exon-intron architecture of the three subunits of ENaC have remained highly conserved despite the divergence of their sequences.

== Gene structure ==
While the human gene SCNN1A is located in chromosome 12p, the human genes encoding SCNN1B and SCNN1G are located in juxtaposition in the short arm of chromosome 16 (16p12-p13). Sequencing of the human genomic DNA indicated that the SCNN1B gene has 13 exons separated by 12 introns. The positions of introns are conserved in all three human ENaC genes, SCNN1A, SCNN1B and SCNN1G. The positions of the introns are also highly conserved across vertebrates. See: Ensembl GeneTree.

Analysis of transcripts of the SCNN1B gene in human kidney and lung showed several alternative transcription and translation initiation sites. However, only one of these transcripts (ENST00000343070) is highly expressed and other transcripts appear at low amounts.

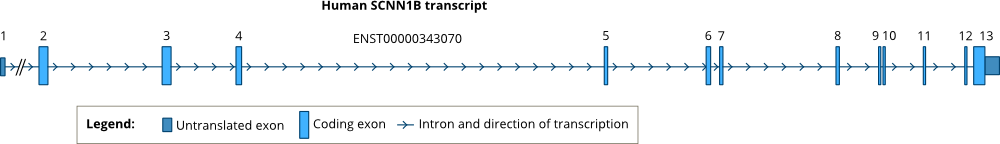
Fig. 1. Exon-intron structure of the major transcript of the human SCNN1B. The number of each exon is marked above the exon. The serial number of the transcript is shown above the transcript. Clicking on the figure will direct the reader to the list of transcripts in the Ensembl database.

== Tissue-specific expression ==
The three ENaC subunits encoded by SCNN1A, SCNN1B, and SCNN1G are commonly expressed in tight epithelia that have low water permeability. The major organs where ENaC is expressed include parts of the kidney tubular epithelia, the respiratory airway, the female reproductive tract, colon, salivary and sweat glands.

ENaC is also expressed in the tongue, where it has been shown to be essential for the perception of salt taste.

The expression of ENaC subunit genes is regulated mainly by the mineralocorticoid hormone aldosterone that is activated by the renin-angiotensin system.

== Protein structure ==
The primary structures of all four ENaC subunits show strong similarity. Thus, these four proteins represent a family of proteins that share a common ancestor. In global alignment (meaning alignments of sequences along their entire length and not just a partial segment), the human β subunit shares 34% identity with the γ subunit and 26 and 23% identity with the α and δ subunits.

All four ENaC subunit sequences have two hydrophobic stretches that form two transmembrane segments named as TM1 and TM2. In the membrane-bound form, the TM segments are embedded in the membrane bilayer, the amino- and carboxy-terminal regions are located inside the cell, and the segment between the two TMs remains outside of the cell as the extracellular region of ENaC. This extracellular region includes about 70% of the residues of each subunit. Thus, in the membrane-bound form, the bulk of each subunit is located outside of the cell.

The structure of ENaC has not been yet determined. Yet, the structure of a homologous protein ASIC1 has been resolved. The chicken ASIC1 structure revealed that ASIC1 is assembled as a homotrimer of three identical subunits. The authors of the original study suggested that each ASIC1 subunit resembles a hand holding a ball. Hence distinct domains of ASIC1 have been referred to as palm, knuckle, finger, thumb, and β-ball.

Alignment of ENaC subunit sequences with ASIC1 sequence reveals that TM1 and TM2 segments and palm domain are conserved, and the knuckle, finger and thumb domains have insertions in ENaC. Site-directed mutagenesis studies on ENaC subunits provide evidence that many basic features of the ASIC1 structural model apply to ENaC as well. Yet, ENaC is an obligate heterotrimer composed of three subunits as an αβγ or a βγδ trimer.

In the carboxy terminus of three ENaC subunits, (α, β and γ) there is a special conserved consensus sequence PPPXYXXL that is called the PY motif. This sequence is recognized by the so-called WW domains in a special E3 ubiquitin-protein ligase named Nedd4-2. Nedd4-2 ligates ubiquitin to the C-terminus of the ENaC subunit which marks the protein for degradation.

== Associated diseases ==
At present, three major hereditary disorders are known to be associated with mutations in the SCNN1B gene. These are: 1. Multisystem pseudohypoaldosteronism, 2. Liddle syndrome, and 3. Cystic fibrosis-like disease.

=== Multi-system form of type I pseudohypoaldosteronism (PHA1B) ===
The disease most commonly associated with mutations in SCNN1B is the multi-system form of type I pseudohypoaldosteronism (PHA1B) that was first characterized by A. Hanukoglu as an autosomal recessive disease. This is a syndrome of unresponsiveness to aldosterone in patients that have high serum levels of aldosterone but suffer from symptoms of aldosterone deficiency with a high risk of mortality due to severe salt loss. Initially, this disease was thought to be a result of a mutation in the mineralocorticoid receptor (NR3C2) that binds aldosterone. But homozygosity mapping in 11 affected families revealed that the disease is associated with two loci on chromosome 12p13.1-pter and chromosome 16p12.2-13 that include the genes for SCNN1A and SCNN1B and SCNN1G respectively. Sequencing of the ENaC genes identified mutation in affected patients, and functional expression of the mutated cDNAs further confirmed that identified mutations lead to the loss of activity of ENaC.

In the majority of the patients with multi-system PHA1B a homozygous mutation or two compound heterozygous mutations have been detected.

=== Liddle syndrome ===
Liddle syndrome is generally caused by mutations in the PY motif or truncation of the C-terminus including loss of the PY motif in the β or γ ENaC subunits. Even though there is a PY motif also in the α subunit, so far Liddle disease has not observed in association with a mutation in the α subunit. Liddle syndrome is inherited as an autosomal dominant disease with a phenotype that includes early onset hypertension, metabolic alkalosis and low levels of plasma renin activity and mineralocorticoid hormone aldosterone. In the absence of a recognizable PY motif, ubiquitin-protein ligase Nedd4-2 cannot bind to the ENaC subunit and hence cannot attach a ubiquitin to it. Consequently, proteolysis of ENaC by proteasome is inhibited and ENaC accumulates in the membrane leading to enhanced activity of ENaC that causes hypertension.

== Interactions ==
SCNN1B has been shown to interact with WWP2 and NEDD4.
