= SCAMP3 =

Protein-coding gene in humans

Identifiers
- Aliases: SCAMP3, C1orf3, secretory carrier membrane protein 3
- External IDs: OMIM: 606913; MGI: 1346346; GeneCards: SCAMP3

Gene location (Human)
Chr.	Chromosome 1 (human)
Band	1q22	Start	155,255,979 bp
Band	1q22	End	155,262,430 bp

Gene location (Mouse)
Chr.	Chromosome 3 (mouse)
Band	3|3 F1	Start	89,084,780 bp
Band	3|3 F1	End	89,090,072 bp
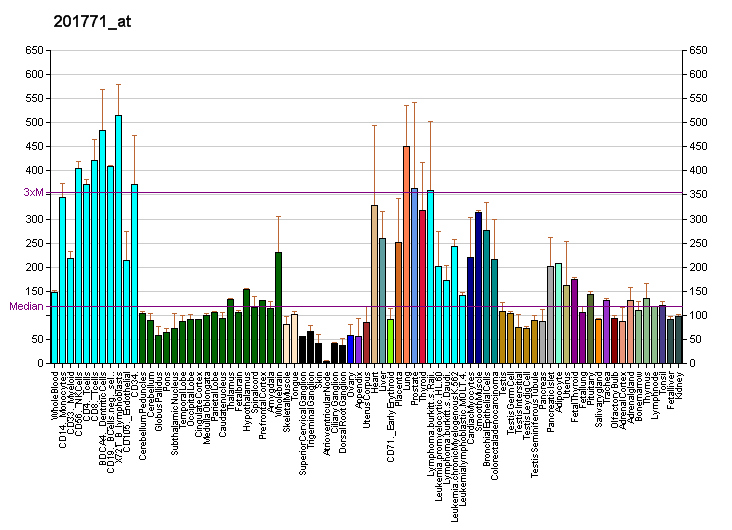
RNA expression pattern
Bgee	Human / Mouse (ortholog); Top expressed in: right adrenal cortex; left adrenal gland; left adrenal cortex; stromal cell of endometrium; apex of heart; left ventricle; skin of leg; mucosa of transverse colon; skin of abdomen; gastrocnemius muscle / Top expressed in: yolk sac; right kidney; zygote; muscle of thigh; external carotid artery; lens; proximal tubule; lip; internal carotid artery; superior frontal gyrus; More reference expression data
BioGPS	More reference expression data
Gene ontology
Molecular function	ubiquitin protein ligase binding
Cellular component	integral component of membrane; extracellular exosome; intracellular membrane-bounded organelle; membrane; Golgi membrane; Golgi apparatus; trans-Golgi network membrane; recycling endosome membrane
Biological process	protein transport; post-Golgi vesicle-mediated transport; transport
Sources:Amigo / QuickGO
Orthologs
Databases	NCBI: entry; OMA: entry
Species	Human	Mouse
Entrez	10067	24045
Ensembl	ENSG00000263290; ENSG00000116521	ENSMUSG00000028049
UniProt	O14828	O35609
RefSeq (mRNA)	NM_005698; NM_052837	NM_011886; NM_001309909; NM_001309910
RefSeq (protein)	NP_005689; NP_443069	NP_001296838; NP_001296839; NP_036016
Location (UCSC)	Chr 1: 155.26 – 155.26 Mb	Chr 3: 89.08 – 89.09 Mb
PubMed search
- Wikidata
View/Edit Human	View/Edit Mouse

Secretory carrier-associated membrane protein 3 is a protein that in humans is encoded by the SCAMP3 gene.

== Function ==
This gene product belongs to the SCAMP family of proteins which are secretory carrier membrane proteins. They function as carriers to the cell surface in post-golgi recycling pathways. Different family members are highly related products of distinct genes, and are usually expressed together. These findings suggest that the SCAMPs may function at the same site during vesicular transport rather than in separate pathways. Two transcript variants encoding different isoforms have been found for this gene.

== Interactions ==
SCAMP3 has been shown to interact with NEDD4.
