= SCNN1A =

Protein-coding gene in the species Homo sapiens

Identifiers
- Aliases: SCNN1A, BESC2, ENaCa, ENaCalpha, SCNEA, SCNN1, sodium channel epithelial 1 alpha subunit, LIDLS3, sodium channel epithelial 1 subunit alpha
- External IDs: OMIM: 600228; MGI: 101782; GeneCards: SCNN1A
Available structures
PDB	Ortholog search: PDBe RCSB
PDB	List of PDB id codes 2M3O

Gene location (Human)
Chr.	Chromosome 12 (human)
Band	12p13.31	Start	6,346,843 bp
Band	12p13.31	End	6,377,730 bp

Gene location (Mouse)
Chr.	Chromosome 6 (mouse)
Band	6 F3|6 59.32 cM	Start	125,297,622 bp
Band	6 F3|6 59.32 cM	End	125,321,906 bp
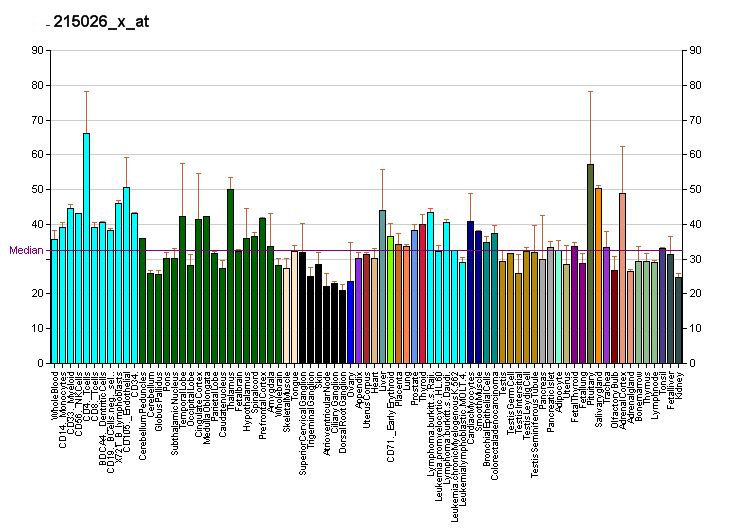

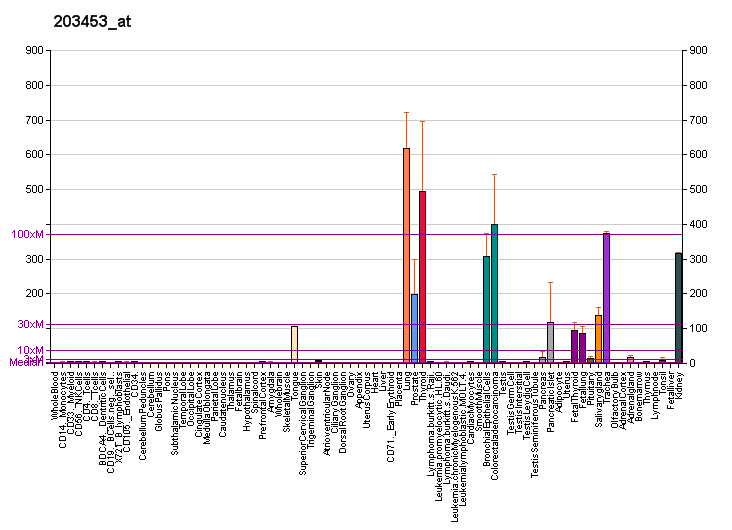
RNA expression pattern
Bgee	Human / Mouse (ortholog); Top expressed in: nasal epithelium; right uterine tube; pancreatic ductal cell; renal medulla; olfactory zone of nasal mucosa; gingival epithelium; mucosa of transverse colon; minor salivary glands; left lobe of thyroid gland; mucosa of pharynx / Top expressed in: granulocyte; right lung lobe; esophagus; left lung lobe; pyloric antrum; right kidney; vestibular membrane of cochlear duct; trachea; lip; left colon; More reference expression data
BioGPS	More reference expression data
Gene ontology
Molecular function	sodium channel activity; protein binding; ligand-gated sodium channel activity; WW domain binding
Cellular component	integral component of membrane; cell projection; membrane; sodium channel complex; integral component of plasma membrane; cilium; ciliary membrane; extracellular exosome; plasma membrane; apical plasma membrane; cytoplasm; sperm principal piece; acrosomal vesicle; cytoplasmic vesicle; motile cilium
Biological process	sodium ion transmembrane transport; response to stimulus; sodium ion transport; ion transport; sodium ion homeostasis; multicellular organismal water homeostasis; sensory perception of taste; ion transmembrane transport
Sources:Amigo / QuickGO
Orthologs
Databases	NCBI: entry; OMA: entry
Species	Human	Mouse
Entrez	6337	20276
Ensembl	ENSG00000111319	ENSMUSG00000030340
UniProt	P37088	Q61180
RefSeq (mRNA)	NM_001159576; NM_001038; NM_001159575	NM_011324
RefSeq (protein)	NP_001029; NP_001153047; NP_001153048	NP_035454; NP_001392957; NP_001392960
Location (UCSC)	Chr 12: 6.35 – 6.38 Mb	Chr 6: 125.3 – 125.32 Mb
PubMed search
- Wikidata
View/Edit Human	View/Edit Mouse

The SCNN1A gene encodes for the α subunit of the epithelial sodium channel ENaC in vertebrates. ENaC is assembled as a heterotrimer composed of three homologous subunits α, β, and γ or δ, β, and γ. The other ENaC subunits are encoded by SCNN1B, SCNN1G, and SCNN1D.

ENaC is expressed in epithelial cells and is different from the voltage-gated sodium channel that is involved in the generation of action potentials in neurons. The abbreviation for the genes encoding for voltage-gated sodium channel starts with three letters: SCN. In contrast to these sodium channels, ENaC is constitutively active and is not voltage-dependent. The second N in the abbreviation (SCNN1A) represents that these are NON-voltage-gated channels.

In most vertebrates, sodium ions are the major determinant of the osmolarity of the extracellular fluid. ENaC allows transfer of sodium ions across the epithelial cell membrane in so-called "tight-epithelia" that have low permeability. The flow of sodium ions across epithelia affects osmolarity of the extracellular fluid. Thus, ENaC plays a central role in the regulation of body fluid and electrolyte homeostasis and consequently affects blood pressure.

As ENaC is strongly inhibited by amiloride, it is also referred to as an "amiloride-sensitive sodium channel".

== History ==
The first mRNA encoding the alpha subunit of ENaC was isolated by two independent groups by screening a rat colon cDNA library.

== Gene structure ==
The human gene SCNN1A is located in the short arm of chromosome 12 (12p3). Human SCNN1A includes 13 exons spanning about 29,000 bp. The protein coding region is located in exons 2-13. The positions of introns are conserved in all four human ENaC genes. The positions of the introns are also highly conserved across vertebrates See: Ensembl GeneTree.

Analysis of α subunit mRNA from human lung and kidney showed that during transcription of SCNN1A gene different mRNAs are produced as a result of alternative translation initiation and splicing sites. The isoforms translated from these differ in their activities.

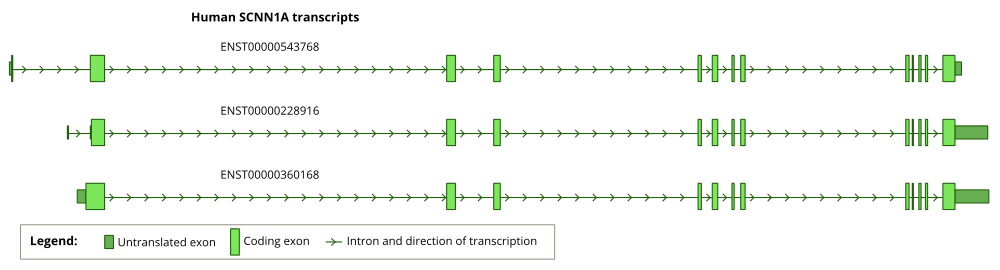
Fig. 1. Exon-intron structures of three transcripts of SCNN1A. The serial number of each transcript is shown above the transcript. Clicking on the figure will direct the reader to the list of transcripts in the Ensembl database.

== Tissue-specific expression ==
SCNN1A, SCNN1B, and SCNN1G are commonly expressed in tight epithelia that have low water permeability. The major organs where ENaC is expressed include parts of the kidney tubular epithelia, the respiratory airway, the female reproductive tract, male reproductive tract, including testis, spermatogonia in the seminiferous tubules, Sertoli cells, and spermatozoa, epididymis, colon and salivary glands. In the skin, SCNN1A is expressed in the keratinocytes in the epidermal layer, in the sebaceous sweat glands, and the smooth muscle cells mostly within the cytoplasm. In contrast, in the eccrine sweat glands ENaC is mostly located on the luminal surface of eccrine duct epithelia.

ENaC is also expressed in the tongue, where it has been shown to be essential for the perception of salt taste.

The expression of ENaC subunit genes is regulated mainly by the mineralocorticoid hormone aldosterone that is activated by the renin-angiotensin system.

== Protein structure ==
The primary structures of all four ENaC subunits show strong similarity. Thus, these four proteins represent a family of proteins that share a common ancestor. In global alignment (meaning alignments of sequences along their entire length and not just a partial segment), the human α subunit shares 34% identity with the δ subunit and 26-27% identity with the β and γ subunits.

All four ENaC subunit sequences have two hydrophobic stretches that form two transmembrane segments named as TM1 and TM2. In the membrane-bound form, the TM segments are embedded in the membrane bilayer, the amino- and carboxy-terminal regions are located inside the cell, and the segment between the two TMs remains outside of the cell as the extracellular region of ENaC. This extracellular region includes about 70% of the residues of each subunit. Thus, in the membrane-bound form, the bulk of each subunit is located outside of the cell.

The structure of ENaC has not been yet determined. Yet, the structure of a homologous protein ASIC1 has been resolved. The chicken ASIC1 structure revealed that ASIC1 is assembled as a homotrimer of three identical subunits. The authors of the original study suggested that the ASIC1 trimer resembles a hand holding a ball. Hence distinct domains of ASIC1 have been referred to as palm, knuckle, finger, thumb, and β-ball.

Alignment of ENaC subunit sequences with ASIC1 sequence reveals that TM1 and TM2 segments and palm domain are conserved, and the knuckle, finger and thumb domains have insertions in ENaC. Site-directed mutagenesis studies on ENaC subunits provide evidence that many basic features of the ASIC1 structural model apply to ENaC as well.

== Associated diseases ==
The disease most commonly associated with mutations in SCNN1A is the multi-system form of type I pseudohypoaldosteronism (PHA1B) that was first characterized by A. Hanukoglu as an autosomal recessive disease. This is a syndrome of unresponsiveness to aldosterone in patients that have high serum levels of aldosterone but suffer from symptoms of aldosterone deficiency with a high risk of mortality due to severe salt loss. Initially, this disease was thought to be a result of a mutation in the mineralocorticoid receptor (NR3C2) that binds aldosterone. But homozygosity mapping in 11 affected families revealed that the disease is associated with two loci on chromosome 12p13.1-pter and chromosome 16p12.2-13 that include the genes for SCNN1A and SCNN1B and SCNN1G respectively. Sequencing of the ENaC genes identified mutation in affected patients, and functional expression of the mutated cDNAs further confirmed that identified mutations lead to the loss of activity of ENaC.

In the majority of the patients with multi-system PHA1B a homozygous mutation or two compound heterozygous mutations have been detected.

A stop mutation in the SCNN1A gene has been shown to be associated with female infertility.

== Interactions ==
SCNN1A has been shown to interact with:

- NEDD4L,
- NEDD4, and
- Ubiquitin C

== See also ==
- Epithelial sodium channel
