= HECW =

HECW may refer to:

- HECW, the ICAO code for Cairo West Air Base in Cairo, Egypt
- HECW1, a human gene
- HECW2, a human gene
