= ASIC2 =

Protein found in humans

Identifiers
- Aliases: ASIC2, ACCN, ACCN1, ASIC2a, BNC1, BNaC1, MDEG, hBNaC1, acid sensing ion channel subunit 2
- External IDs: OMIM: 601784; MGI: 1100867; GeneCards: ASIC2

Gene location (Human)
Chr.	Chromosome 17 (human)
Band	17q11.2-q12	Start	33,013,087 bp
Band	17q11.2-q12	End	34,174,964 bp

Gene location (Mouse)
Chr.	Chromosome 11 (mouse)
Band	11 B5|11 48.43 cM	Start	80,770,995 bp
Band	11 B5|11 48.43 cM	End	81,859,283 bp
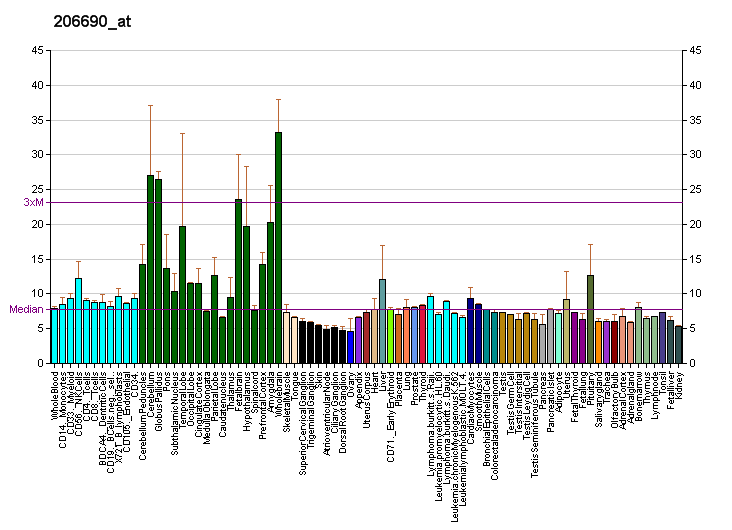
RNA expression pattern
Bgee	Human / Mouse (ortholog); Top expressed in: prefrontal cortex; cingulate gyrus; anterior cingulate cortex; Brodmann area 9; cerebellar cortex; cerebellar hemisphere; right hemisphere of cerebellum; Brodmann area 10; Brodmann area 46; orbitofrontal cortex / Top expressed in: perirhinal cortex; entorhinal cortex; CA3 field; primary motor cortex; dorsomedial hypothalamic nucleus; primary visual cortex; central gray substance of midbrain; paraventricular nucleus of hypothalamus; cingulate gyrus; lateral hypothalamus; More reference expression data
BioGPS	More reference expression data
Gene ontology
Molecular function	ion gated channel activity; sodium channel activity; ion channel activity; protein binding; cation channel activity; ligand-gated sodium channel activity; acid-sensing ion channel activity
Cellular component	integral component of membrane; membrane; plasma membrane; dendritic spine; integral component of plasma membrane; synapse; soma; neuron projection
Biological process	chemical synaptic transmission; positive regulation of synapse assembly; peripheral nervous system development; sodium ion transmembrane transport; detection of mechanical stimulus involved in sensory perception; sodium ion transport; regulation of membrane potential; regulation of ion transmembrane transport; response to mechanical stimulus; negative regulation of apoptotic process; cation transport; hearing; sensory perception of sour taste; ion transport; cation transmembrane transport; central nervous system development; ion transmembrane transport; regulation of vasoconstriction; protein localization to synapse; response to acidic pH; phototransduction; regulation of systemic arterial blood pressure by aortic arch baroreceptor feedback
Sources:Amigo / QuickGO
Orthologs
Databases	NCBI: entry; OMA: entry
Species	Human	Mouse
Entrez	40	11418
Ensembl	ENSG00000108684	ENSMUSG00000020704
UniProt	Q16515	Q925H0
RefSeq (mRNA)	NM_183377; NM_001094	NM_001034013; NM_007384
RefSeq (protein)	NP_001085; NP_899233	NP_001029185; NP_031410
Location (UCSC)	Chr 17: 33.01 – 34.17 Mb	Chr 11: 80.77 – 81.86 Mb
PubMed search
- Wikidata
View/Edit Human	View/Edit Mouse

Acid-sensing ion channel 2 (ASIC2) also known as amiloride-sensitive cation channel 1, neuronal (ACCN1) or brain sodium channel 1 (BNaC1) is a protein that in humans is encoded by the ASIC2 gene. The ASIC2 gene is one of the five paralogous genes that encode proteins that form trimeric acid-sensing ion channels (ASICs) in mammals. The cDNA of this gene was first cloned in 1996. The ASIC genes have splicing variants that encode different proteins that are called isoforms.

These genes are mainly expressed in the central and peripheral nervous system.

ASICs can form both homotrimeric (meaning composed of three identical subunits) and heterotrimeric channels.

== Structure and function ==
This gene encodes a member of the ASIC/ENaC superfamily of proteins. The members of this family are amiloride-sensitive sodium channels that contain intracellular N and C termini, 2 hydrophobic transmembrane (TM) regions, and a large extracellular loop, which has many cysteine residues with conserved spacing. The TM regions are generally symbolized as TM1 (close to N-terminus) and TM2 (close to C-terminus).

The pore of the channel through which ions selectively flow from the extracellular side into the cytoplasm is formed by the three TM2 regions of the trimer.
