= NEDD4L =

Protein-coding gene in the species Homo sapiens

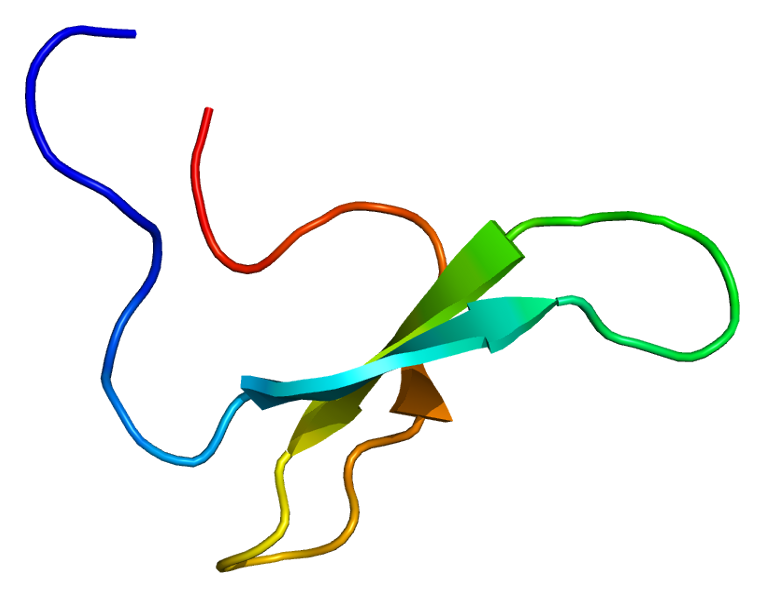

Identifiers
- Aliases: NEDD4L, NEDD4-2, NEDD4.2, RSP5, hNEDD4-2, neural precursor cell expressed, developmentally down-regulated 4-like, E3 ubiquitin protein ligase, PVNH7, NEDD4 like E3 ubiquitin protein ligase
- External IDs: OMIM: 606384; MGI: 1933754; GeneCards: NEDD4L
Available structures
PDB	Ortholog search: PDBe RCSB
PDB	List of PDB id codes 2LAJ, 2LB2, 2LTY, 2MPT, 2NSQ, 2ONI, 3JVZ, 3JW0, 5HPK
Enzyme activity
EC #	BRENDA	ExPASy	KEGG	MetaCyc
2.3.2.26	↗	↗	↗	↗
2.3.2.36	↗	↗	↗	↗

Gene location (Human)
Chr.	Chromosome 18 (human)
Band	18q21.31	Start	58,044,226 bp
Band	18q21.31	End	58,401,540 bp

Gene location (Mouse)
Chr.	Chromosome 18 (mouse)
Band	18|18 E1	Start	64,887,705 bp
Band	18|18 E1	End	65,217,828 bp
RNA expression pattern
Bgee	Human / Mouse (ortholog); Top expressed in: ventricular zone; ganglionic eminence; olfactory zone of nasal mucosa; right lung; secondary oocyte; body of pancreas; upper lobe of left lung; rectum; epithelium of colon; human kidney / Top expressed in: Rostral migratory stream; olfactory tubercle; zygote; mammillary body; nucleus accumbens; secondary oocyte; habenula; anterior amygdaloid area; lateral septal nucleus; left lung lobe; More reference expression data
BioGPS	n/a
Gene ontology
Molecular function	potassium channel inhibitor activity; sodium channel regulator activity; transmembrane transporter binding; sodium channel inhibitor activity; potassium channel regulator activity; protein binding; transferase activity; ubiquitin-protein transferase activity; ubiquitin protein ligase activity
Cellular component	cytosol; plasma membrane; intracellular anatomical structure; nucleoplasm; extracellular exosome; endosome; multivesicular body; Golgi apparatus; cytoplasm
Biological process	negative regulation of sodium ion transmembrane transport; cell differentiation; positive regulation of caveolin-mediated endocytosis; excretion; positive regulation of protein catabolic process; viral life cycle; sodium ion transport; cellular sodium ion homeostasis; negative regulation of sodium ion transmembrane transporter activity; regulation of membrane potential; regulation of ion transmembrane transport; ventricular cardiac muscle cell action potential; response to metal ion; negative regulation of transcription by RNA polymerase II; protein monoubiquitination; water homeostasis; regulation of membrane depolarization; protein K48-linked ubiquitination; positive regulation of endocytosis; negative regulation of protein localization to cell surface; ion transmembrane transport; negative regulation of potassium ion transmembrane transporter activity; protein ubiquitination; regulation of potassium ion transmembrane transporter activity; regulation of protein catabolic process; negative regulation of potassium ion transmembrane transport; regulation of membrane repolarization; positive regulation of dendrite extension; proteasome-mediated ubiquitin-dependent protein catabolic process; protein polyubiquitination; viral process; ubiquitin-dependent protein catabolic process; regulation of protein stability; regulation of dendrite morphogenesis
Sources:Amigo / QuickGO
Orthologs
Databases	NCBI: entry; OMA: entry
Species	Human	Mouse
Entrez	23327	83814
Ensembl	ENSG00000049759	ENSMUSG00000024589
UniProt	Q96PU5	Q8CFI0
RefSeq (mRNA)	NM_001144964; NM_001144965; NM_001144966; NM_001144967; NM_001144968 NM_001144969; NM_001144970; NM_001144971; NM_001243960; NM_015277	NM_001114386; NM_031881
RefSeq (protein)	NP_001138436; NP_001138437; NP_001138438; NP_001138439; NP_001138440 NP_001138441; NP_001138442; NP_001138443; NP_001230889; NP_056092	NP_001107858; NP_114087; NP_001390936; NP_001390937; NP_001390938 NP_001390942
Location (UCSC)	Chr 18: 58.04 – 58.4 Mb	Chr 18: 64.89 – 65.22 Mb
PubMed search
- Wikidata
View/Edit Human	View/Edit Mouse

Neural precursor cell expressed developmentally downregulated gene 4-like (NEDD4L) or NEDD4-2 is an enzyme (ubiquitin ligase) of the NEDD4 family. In human the protein is encoded by the NEDD4L gene. In mouse the protein is commonly known as NEDD4-2 and the gene Nedd4-2.

NEDD4-2 has been shown to ubiquitinate and therefore down regulate the epithelial sodium channel (ENaC) in the collecting ducts of the kidneys, therefore opposing the actions of aldosterone and increasing salt excretion. In Liddle's Syndrome NEDD4 is unable to bind to the ENaC and lead to salt retention and hypertension occur.

NEDD4L belongs to the NEDD4 family of E3 HECT domain ubiquitin ligases. It is the closest homologue of NEDD4, the prototypic member of the family and probably arose as a result of gene duplication. While NEDD4 orthologues are present in all eukaryotes, NEDD4L proteins are limited to vertebrates. NEDD4L proteins are known to be involved in regulating many membrane proteins via ubiquitination and endocytosis.

NEDD4L protein is expressed widely. The primary targets of NEDD4-2 include the epithelial sodium channel (ENaC), the Na+-Cl- co-transporter (NCC), and the voltage gated sodium channels (Na_{v}s), although additional targets are predicted from in vitro studies. NEDD4-2 gene in mice is essential for animal survival and the polymorphisms in NEDD4L are associated with human hypertension.

== Protein architecture ==
The NEDD4-2 protein consists of an amino-terminal Ca2+-phospholipid binding domain (C2), 4 WW domains (protein-protein interaction domains) and the carboxyl-terminal HECT domain (ubiquitin ligase domain). The WW domains in the protein are responsible for binding the substrates, regulatory proteins and adaptors. These domains generally recognize PPxY (or similar) motifs in the target proteins.

== Expression ==
Human NEDD4L gene is located on chromosome 18q12.31 with 38 exons that transcribe multiple splice variants of NEDD4L. The protein expressed in the brain, lung, heart and the kidney contains a C2 domain. Three predominant forms of NEDD4L are isoform I containing a novel C2 domain with a start codon in exon1, isoform II with an intact conserved C2 domain consisting of an alternate start codon in exon 1 upstream of the actual start codon of the isoform 1, and isoform III lacking a C2 domain due to exon 2a–3 splicing. Isoform 1 is found to be abundant in kidney and adrenal gland whereas isoform 2 is predominantly found in the lungs. The antibodies specific to NEDD4-2 recognize two species of ~110-115 kDa in most tissues, with one being variable depending on the tissue.

== Function ==
NEDD4L is a ubiquitin-protein ligase (E3) that accepts ubiquitin from an E2 ubiquitin-conjugating enzyme in the form of a thioester and then transfers it to specific substrates.

In vivo NEDD4-2 regulates ENaC in the lung and kidney, the renal NCC and several Navs. It has also been shown to regulate EGFR, TGFβ receptor and WNT signalling. NEDD4L has been implicated in viral budding and viral latency processes via ubiquitination of viral proteins. In vitro data implicate NEDD4-2 in the regulation of many other proteins, including several ion channels and transporters. However most of these results have not been validated in vivo.

== Regulation of NEDD4-2 ==
NDFIP1 and NDFIP2 proteins bind NEDD4-2 and regulate its activity and/or interaction with substrates. NEDD4-2 phosphorylation by kinases SGK1 and AKT in response to insulin and aldosterone signaling results in its interaction with 14-3-3 proteins. 14-3-3 binding to NEDD4-2 inhibits its ability to bind and ubiquitinate its substrates (such the ENaC subunits). Autoubiquitination and deubiquitylation of NEDD4-2 by USP2-45 are also known to maintain NEDD4-2 protein stability.

== Clinical significance ==
NEDD4L is a critical regulator of renal ENaC and NCC and malfunction of this pathway has been linked to hypertension, as in Liddle's syndrome, a genetic disorder where mutations in the ENaC subunits abrogate NEDD4L binding. In mouse, NEDD4-2 deletion leads to increased cell surface expression and activity of ENaC in the lung, resulting in premature clearance of lung fluid, airway drying, lung inflammation and perinatal lethality.

Specific deletion of NEDD4-2 in mouse renal tubules leads to increased expression of ENaC and NCC. Consistent with the critical function in ENaC and NCC regulation, NEDDL polymorphisms are linked to essential hypertension in certain human populations. Specific deletion of NEDD4-2 in mouse neurons results in axonal branching defects. Isolated fetal cortical neurons from NEDD4-2 knockout mice show defective regulation of voltage-gated sodium currents, and in animal models of neuropathic pain NEDD4-2 expression has been found to be downregulated. Also NEDD4-2-deficiency results in hyperexcitability of DRG neurons and contributes to pathological pain

== Interactions ==
NEDD4L has been shown to interact with SCNN1A.
