= Hydrochlorothiazide/triamterene =

Combination medication

Combination of
- Hydrochlorothiazide: Thiazide diuretic
- Triamterene: Potassium-sparing diuretic

Clinical data
- Trade names: Dyazide, Maxzide, others
- Other names: co-triamterzide
- AHFS/Drugs.com: Professional Drug Facts
- License data: US DailyMed: Hydrochlorothiazide and triamterene
- Pregnancy category: AU: C
- Routes of administration: By mouth
- ATC code: C03EA01 (WHO)

Legal status
- Legal status: US: ℞-only

Identifiers
- CAS Number: 14124-50-6
- KEGG: D10269

Hydrochlorothiazide/triamterene, also known as co-triamterzide, is a fixed-dose combination medication of hydrochlorothiazide and triamterene. It is used to treat high blood pressure and edema (swelling). Specifically it is used in those who develop low blood potassium (hypokalemia) when on only hydrochlorothiazide. It is taken by mouth.

Side effects may include nausea, trouble sleeping, dizziness, feeling light headed with standing, kidney problems, allergies, and muscle cramps. Other serious side effects may include high blood potassium. Use in pregnancy and breastfeeding is not generally recommended. Use in those with significant kidney problems is not recommended. It decreases blood pressure mainly by hydrochlorothiazide while triamterene decreases the amount of potassium lost.

The combination was approved for medical use in the United States in 1965. In 2023, it was the 115th most commonly prescribed medication in the United States, with more than 5 million prescriptions.
