= WWP2 =

Protein-coding gene in humans

Identifiers
- Aliases: WWP2, AIP2, WWp2-like, WW domain containing E3 ubiquitin protein ligase 2
- External IDs: OMIM: 602308; MGI: 1914144; GeneCards: WWP2
Available structures
PDB	Ortholog search: PDBe RCSB
PDB	List of PDB id codes 4Y07
Enzyme activity
EC #	BRENDA	ExPASy	KEGG	MetaCyc
2.3.2.26	↗	↗	↗	↗

Gene location (Human)
Chr.	Chromosome 16 (human)
Band	16q22.1	Start	69,762,328 bp
Band	16q22.1	End	69,941,741 bp

Gene location (Mouse)
Chr.	Chromosome 8 (mouse)
Band	8|8 D3	Start	108,162,997 bp
Band	8|8 D3	End	108,285,227 bp
RNA expression pattern
Bgee	Human / Mouse (ortholog); Top expressed in: tibia; tendon of biceps brachii; ascending aorta; Descending thoracic aorta; sural nerve; right coronary artery; popliteal artery; tibial arteries; pancreatic ductal cell; endothelial cell / Top expressed in: facial skeleton; sphenoid bone; basisphenoid; splanchnocranium; thumb; membranous bone; index finger; phalanx of index finger; tunica media of zone of aorta; bones of pectoral girdle; More reference expression data
BioGPS	n/a
Gene ontology
Molecular function	transcription factor binding; ubiquitin-protein transferase activity; protein binding; transferase activity; ubiquitin protein ligase activity
Cellular component	membrane; ubiquitin ligase complex; extracellular exosome; nucleus; cytoplasm; cytosol
Biological process	regulation of membrane potential; regulation of ion transmembrane transport; negative regulation of transcription by RNA polymerase II; transcription by RNA polymerase II; negative regulation of DNA-binding transcription factor activity; negative regulation of gene expression; negative regulation of protein transport; regulation of potassium ion transmembrane transporter activity; viral entry into host cell; viral process; negative regulation of transcription, DNA-templated; negative regulation of transporter activity; positive regulation of transcription by RNA polymerase II; proteasome-mediated ubiquitin-dependent protein catabolic process; protein autoubiquitination; ubiquitin-dependent protein catabolic process; protein K63-linked ubiquitination; extracellular transport; protein ubiquitination; protein polyubiquitination; positive regulation of protein catabolic process; negative regulation of Notch signaling pathway
Sources:Amigo / QuickGO
Orthologs
Databases	NCBI: entry; OMA: entry
Species	Human	Mouse
Entrez	11060	66894
Ensembl	ENSG00000198373	ENSMUSG00000031930
UniProt	O00308	Q9DBH0
RefSeq (mRNA)	NM_001270453; NM_001270454; NM_001270455; NM_007014; NM_199424	NM_025830
RefSeq (protein)	NP_001257382; NP_001257383; NP_001257384; NP_008945; NP_955456	NP_080106
Location (UCSC)	Chr 16: 69.76 – 69.94 Mb	Chr 8: 108.16 – 108.29 Mb
PubMed search
- Wikidata
View/Edit Human	View/Edit Mouse

NEDD4-like E3 ubiquitin-protein ligase WWP2 also known as atrophin-1-interacting protein 2 (AIP2) or WW domain-containing protein 2 (WWP2) is an enzyme that in humans is encoded by the WWP2 gene.

== Function ==
This gene encodes a member of the NEDD4-like protein family. The family of proteins is known to possess ubiquitin-protein ligase activity. The encoded protein contains 4 tandem WW domains. The WW domain is a protein motif consisting of 35 to 40 amino acids and is characterized by 4 conserved aromatic residues. The WW domain may mediate specific protein–protein interactions. Three alternatively spliced transcript variants encoding distinct isoforms have been found for this gene. In neurons, murine ortholog Wwp2 and its homolog Wwp1 control polarity acquisition, formation, and branching of axons, as well as migration of newly born nerve cells into the cortical plate.

== Interactions ==
WWP2 has been shown to interact with SCNN1B and ATN1.

== Clinical significance ==
Full-length WWP2 (WWP2-FL), together with N-terminal, (WWP2-N); C-terminal (WWP2-C) isoforms bind to SMAD proteins. WWP2-FL interacts with SMAD2, SMAD3 and SMAD7 in the TGF-β pathway. The WWP2-N isoform interacts with SMAD2 and SMAD3, whereas WWP2-C interacts only with SMAD7. Disruption of interactions between WWP2 and SMAD7 can stabilize SMAD7 protein levels and prevent TGF-β induced Epithelial-mesenchymal transition. Hence inhibiting WWP2 may in turn lead to the disabling of an inhibitor that normally controls cell growth and tumorogenesis. In tissue cultures lacking the inhibitor SMAD7, cancer cells spread rapidly, so that silencing WWP2 prevented the spread.
