= Epithelial sodium channel =

Group of membrane proteins

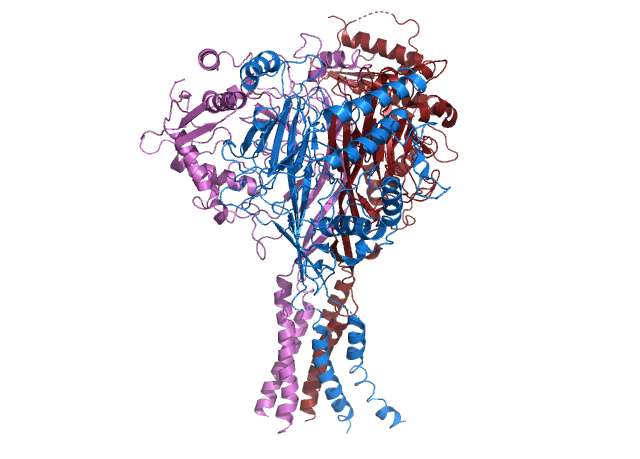
- Structure of human ENaC.

Identifiers
- Symbol: ASC
- Pfam: PF00858
- InterPro: IPR001873
- PROSITE: PDOC00926
- SCOP2: 6BQN / SCOPe / SUPFAM
- TCDB: 1.A.6
- OPM superfamily: 181
- OPM protein: 4fz1
Available protein structures:
- PDB: 6BQN IPR001873 PF00858 (ECOD; PDBsum)
- AlphaFold: IPR001873; PF00858

The epithelial sodium channel (ENaC), also known as amiloride-sensitive sodium channel, is a membrane-bound ion channel that is selectively permeable to sodium ions (Na^{+}). It is assembled as a heterotrimer composed of three homologous subunits α or δ, β, and γ, These subunits are encoded by four genes: SCNN1A, SCNN1B, SCNN1G, and SCNN1D. The ENaC is involved primarily in the reabsorption of sodium ions at the collecting ducts of the kidney's nephrons. In addition to being implicated in diseases where fluid balance across epithelial membranes is perturbed, including pulmonary edema, cystic fibrosis, COPD and COVID-19, proteolyzed forms of ENaC function as the human salt taste receptor.

The apical membranes of many tight epithelia contain sodium channels that are characterized primarily by their high affinity for the diuretic blocker amiloride. These channels mediate the first step of active sodium reabsorption essential for the maintenance of body salt and water homeostasis. In vertebrates, the channels control reabsorption of sodium in kidney, colon, lung and sweat glands; they also play a role in taste perception.

The epithelial sodium channels are structurally and probably evolutionary related to P2X purinoreceptors, pain receptors that activate when they detect ATP.

== Function ==
ENaC is located in the apical membrane of polarized epithelial cells in particular in the kidney (primarily in the collecting tubule), the lung, the skin, the male and female reproductive tracts and the colon.

=== Sodium balance regulation ===
==== Kidney and colon ====
Epithelial sodium channels facilitate Na⁺ reabsorption across the apical membranes of epithelia in the distal nephron, respiratory and reproductive tracts and exocrine glands. Since Na⁺ ion concentration is a major determinant of extracellular fluid osmolarity, changes in Na⁺ concentration affect the movement of fluids and consequently fluid volume and blood pressure.

Aldosterone increased insertion of ENaCs into the apical membranes in the kidney as well as the colon. In the kidney, it is inhibited by atrial natriuretic peptide, causing natriuresis and diuresis.

It can be blocked by either triamterene or amiloride, which are used medically to serve as diuretics.

==== Brain ====
Epithelial Na+ channels (ENaCs) in the brain play a significant role in the regulation of blood pressure. Vasopressin (VP) neurons play a pivotal role in coordinating neuroendocrine and autonomic responses to maintain cardiovascular homeostasis. High dietary salt intake causes an increase in the expression and activity of ENaC which results in the steady state depolarization of VP neurons. This is one of the mechanisms underlying how dietary salt intake affects the activity of VP neurons via ENaC activity. ENaC channels in the brain are involved in blood pressure response to dietary sodium.

=== Ciliary epithelium ===
High-resolution immunofluorescence studies revealed that in the respiratory tract and the female reproductive tract, ENaC is located along the entire length of cilia that cover the surface of multi-ciliated cells. Hence, in these epithelia with motile cilia, ENaC functions as a regulator of the osmolarity of the periciliary fluid, and its function is essential to maintain fluid volume at a depth necessary for the motility of the cilia. In the respiratory tract this movement is essential for clearing mucosal surface, and in the female reproductive tract, motility of the cilia is essential for the movement of oocytes.

In contrast to ENaC, CFTR that regulates chloride ion transport is not found on cilia. These findings contradict a previous hypothesis that ENaC is downregulated by direct interaction with CFTR. In patients with cystic fibrosis (CF), CFTR cannot downregulate ENaC, causing hyper-absorption in the lungs and recurrent lung infections. It has been suggested that it may be a ligand-gated ion channel.

=== Skin ===
In the skin epidermal layers, ENaC is expressed in the keratinocytes, sebaceous glands, and smooth muscle cells. In these cells ENaC is mostly located in the cytoplasm.

In eccrine sweat glands, ENaC is predominantly located in the apical membrane facing the lumen of the sweat ducts. The major function of ENaC in these ducts is the re-uptake of Na⁺ ions that are excreted in sweat. In patients with ENaC mutations that cause systemic pseudohypoaldosteronism type I, the patients can lose a significant amount of Na⁺ ions, especially under hot climates.

=== Touch ===
Homologues of acid-sensing ion channels (ASIC) of the ENaC family mediate touch sensation in invertebrates (including the model organism C. elegans), and had also been thought responsible for mechanoactivated membrane currents in higher animals. ASIC are abundantly expressed in sensory ganglia neurons of higher animals, and touch and pain sensation is altered but not abolished in animals lacking ASIC, suggesting the channels modulate sensory transduction while not underlying the mechanoreceptor activation itself in higher animals (this is now thought to be carried out by PIEZO2 instead).

=== Taste ===
ENaC is present in apical cell membranes of taste receptors where it likely participates in sensing saltiness and sourness. In rodents, virtually the entire salt taste is mediated by ENaC, whereas it seems to play a less significant role in humans: About 20 percent can be accredited to the epithelial sodium channel.

Protoelyzed variants of ENaC also function as human salt taste receptors. This role was first confirmed using human sensory studies to evaluate the effect of 4-propylphenyl 2-furoate on the perception of the salty taste of table salt, sodium chloride (NaCl). 4-propylphenyl 2-furoate is a compound that was discovered to activate proteolyzed ENaC.

== Biochemistry ==
=== Ion selectivity ===
Studies show that the ENaC channel is permeable to Na^{+} and Li^{+} ions, but has very little permeability to K^{+}, Cs^{+} or Rb^{+} ions.

=== Structure ===
A diagram demonstrating the arrangement of the subunits

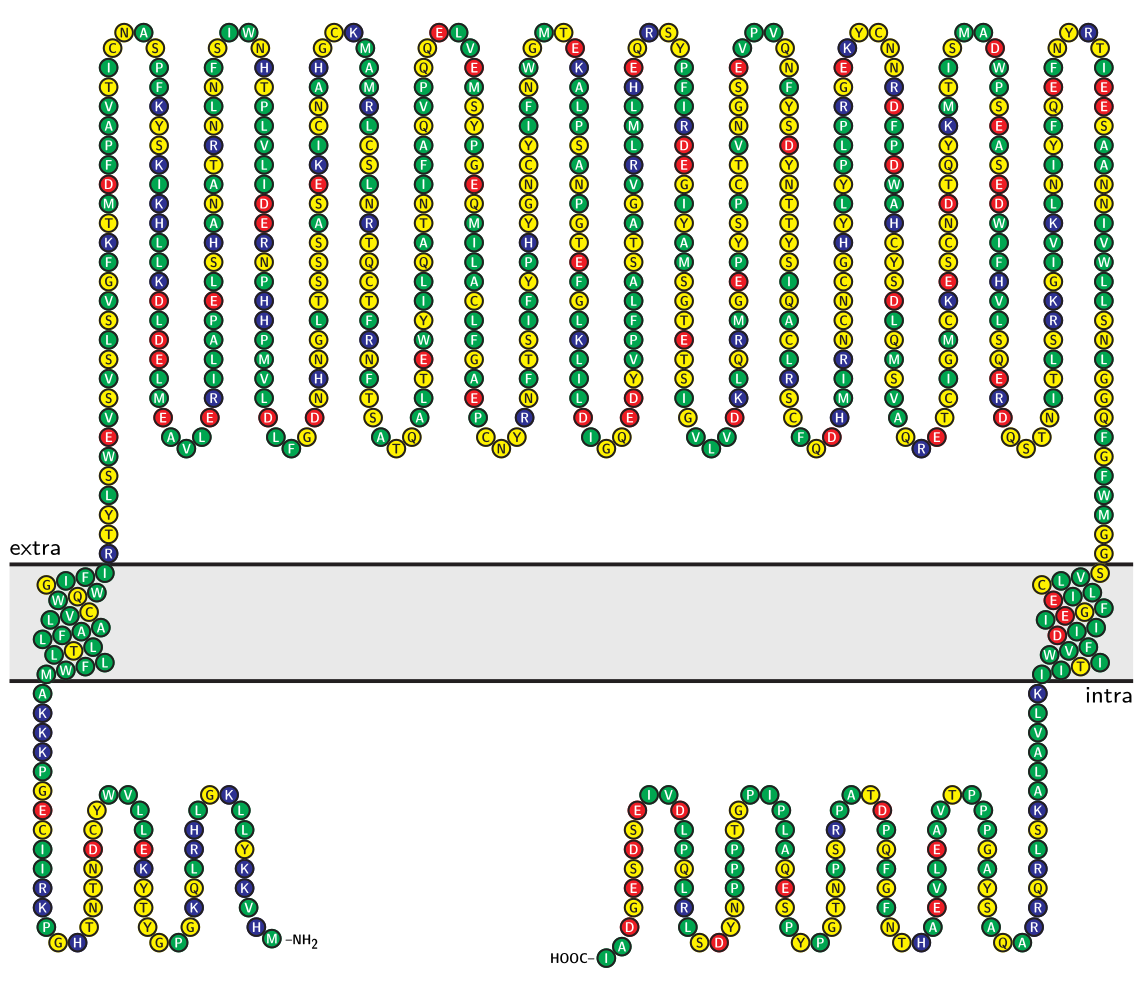
Sequence of the β-subunit of human ENaC with two transmembrane domains (red: acidic, blue: basic, yellow: uncharged polar, green: hydrophobic nonpolar)

ENaC consists of three different subunits: α, β, γ. All three subunits are essential for transport to the membrane assembly of functional channels on the membrane. The C-terminus of each ENaC subunit contains a PPXY motif which when mutated or deleted in either the β- or γ-ENaC subunit leads to Liddle's syndrome, a human autosomal dominant form of hypertension. The cryoEM structure of ENaC indicates that the channel is a heterotrimeric protein like the acid-sensing ion channel 1 (ASIC1), which belongs to the same family. Each of the subunits consists of two transmembrane helices and an extracellular loop. The amino- and carboxy-termini of all three polypeptides are located in the cytosol.

Crystal structure of ASIC1 and site-directed mutagenesis studies suggest that ENaC has a central ion channel located along the central symmetry axis in between the three subunits.

In terms of structure, the proteins that belong to this family consist of about 510 to 920 amino acid residues. They are made of an intracellular N-terminus region followed by a transmembrane domain, a large extracellular loop, a second transmembrane segment, and a C-terminal intracellular tail.

==== δ-subunit ====
In addition there is a fourth, so-called δ-subunit, that shares considerable sequence similarity with the α-subunit and can form a functional ion-channel together with the β- and γ-subunits. Such δ-, β-, γ-ENaC appear in pancreas, testes, lung, and ovaries. Their function is yet unknown.

=== Families ===
The epithelial sodium (Na^{+}) channel (ENaC) family belongs to the ENaC/P2X superfamily. ENaC and P2X receptors have similar 3-d structures and are homologous.

Members of the epithelial Na^{+} channel (ENaC) family fall into four subfamilies, termed alpha, beta, gamma and delta. The proteins exhibit the same apparent topology, each with two transmembrane (TM)-spanning segments (TMS), separated by a large extracellular loop. In most ENaC proteins studied to date, the extracellular domains are highly conserved and contain numerous cysteine residues, with flanking C-terminal amphipathic TM regions, postulated to contribute to the formation of the hydrophilic pores of the oligomeric channel protein complexes. It is thought that the well-conserved extracellular domains serve as receptors to control the activities of the channels.

The vertebrate ENaC proteins from epithelial cells cluster tightly together on the phylogenetic tree; voltage-insensitive ENaC homologues are also found in the brain. The many sequenced C. elegans proteins, including the worm degenerins, are distantly related to the vertebrate proteins as well as to each other. Vertebrate ENaC proteins are similar to degenerins of Caenorhabditis elegans: deg-1, del-1, mec-4, mec-10 and unc-8. These proteins can be mutated to cause neuronal degradation, and are also thought to form sodium channels.

== Genetics ==
The exon–intron architecture of the three genes encoding the three subunits of ENaC have remained highly conserved despite the divergence of their sequences.

- SCNN1A, SCNN1B, SCNN1G, SCNN1D

There are four related amiloride sensitive sodium channels:

- ACCN1, ACCN2, ACCN3, ACCN4

== Clinical significance ==
Structure of amiloride, a channel blocker

ENaC interaction with CFTR is of important pathophysiological relevance in cystic fibrosis. CFTR is a transmembrane channel responsible for chloride transport and defects in this protein cause cystic fibrosis, partly through upregulation of the ENaC channel in the absence of functional CFTR.

In the airways, CFTR allows for the secretion of chloride, and sodium ions and water follow passively. However, in the absence of functional CFTR, the ENaC channel is upregulated, and further decreases salt and water secretion by reabsorbing sodium ions. As such, the respiratory complications in cystic fibrosis are not solely caused by the lack of chloride secretion but instead by the increase in sodium and water reabsorption. This results in the deposition of thick, dehydrated mucus, which collects in the respiratory tract, interfering with gas exchange and allowing for the collection of bacteria. Nevertheless, an upregulation of CFTR does not correct the influence of high-activity ENaC. Probably other interacting proteins are necessary to maintain a functional ion homeostasis in epithelial tissue of the lung, like potassium channels, aquaporins or Na/K-ATPase.

In sweat glands, CFTR is responsible for the reabsorption of chloride in the sweat duct. Sodium ions follow passively through ENaC as a result of the electrochemical gradient caused by chloride flow. This reduces salt and water loss. In the absence of chloride flow in cystic fibrosis, sodium ions do not flow through ENaC, leading to greater salt and water loss. (This is true despite upregulation of the ENaC channel, as flow in the sweat ducts is limited by the electrochemical gradient set up by chloride flow through CFTR.) As such, patients' skin tastes salty, and this is commonly used to help diagnose the disease, both in the past and today by modern electrical tests.

Gain of function mutations to the β and γ subunits are associated with Liddle's syndrome.

Amiloride and triamterene are potassium-sparing diuretics that act as epithelial sodium channel blockers.

== Biotechnology ==
Expression of ENaC in mammalian cell cultures is cytotoxic, resulting in sodium uptake, cell swelling and cell death, complicating production of stable cell lines to study ENaC. Chromovert technology enabled the production of a stable ENaC cell line using fluorogenic signaling probes and flow cytometry to scan numerous cells to isolate rare clones capable of functional, stable and viable expression of ENaC.
