= Triamterene =

Chemical compound

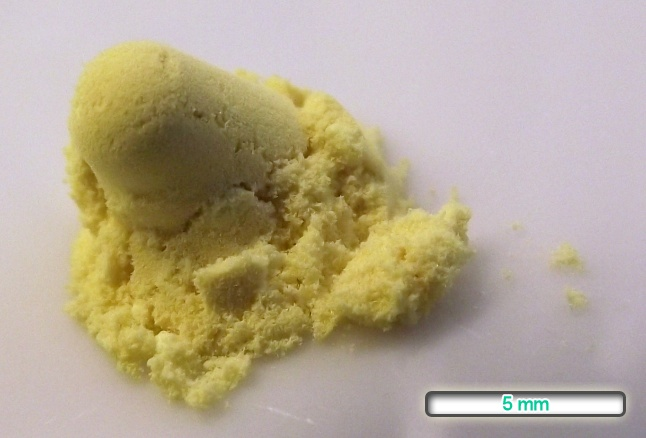

Clinical data
- Trade names: Dyrenium, others
- AHFS/Drugs.com: Monograph
- MedlinePlus: a682337
- Pregnancy category: AU: C
- Routes of administration: By mouth
- ATC code: C03DB02 (WHO)

Legal status
- Legal status: AU: S4 (Prescription only); UK: POM (Prescription only); US: ℞-only

Pharmacokinetic data
- Bioavailability: 30-70%
- Protein binding: 67%
- Metabolism: hydroxylation to para-hydroxytriamterene
- Elimination half-life: 1-2 hours, active metabolite 3 hours
- Excretion: renal <50%, 21% unchanged

Identifiers
- IUPAC name: 6-phenylpteridine-2,4,7-triamine
- CAS Number: 396-01-0
- PubChem CID: 5546
- IUPHAR/BPS: 4329
- DrugBank: DB00384
- ChemSpider: 5345
- UNII: WS821Z52LQ
- KEGG: D00386
- ChEMBL: ChEMBL585
- CompTox Dashboard (EPA): DTXSID6021373
- ECHA InfoCard: 100.006.278

Chemical and physical data
- Formula: C_{12}H_{11}N_{7}
- Molar mass: 253.269 g·mol^{−1}
- 3D model (JSmol): Interactive image
- SMILES: NC1=C2C(N=C(N)C(C3=CC=CC=C3)=N2)=NC(N)=N1
- InChI: InChI=1S/C12H11N7/c13-9-7(6-4-2-1-3-5-6)16-8-10(14)18-12(15)19-11(8)17-9/h1-5H,(H6,13,14,15,17,18,19); Key:FNYLWPVRPXGIIP-UHFFFAOYSA-N

Triamterene (traded under names such as Dyrenium and Dytac) is a potassium-sparing diuretic often used in combination with thiazide diuretics for the treatment of high blood pressure or swelling. The combination with hydrochlorothiazide, is known as hydrochlorothiazide/triamterene.

== Side effects ==
Common side effects may include a depletion of sodium, folic acid, and calcium, nausea, vomiting, diarrhea, headache, dizziness, fatigue, and dry mouth. Serious side effects may include heart palpitations, tingling/numbness, fever, chills, sore throat, rash, and back pain. Triamterene can also cause kidney stones through direct crystallization or by seeding calcium oxalate stones. Triamterene is best avoided in patients with chronic kidney disease due to the possibility of hyperkalemia. People using this drug should use salt substitute cautiously.

Triamterene may impart a blue fluorescent color to the urine.

== Caution with certain disease states ==
Diabetes: Use with caution in people with prediabetes or diabetes mellitus as there may be a change in glucose control.

Liver impairment: Use with caution in people with severe liver dysfunction; in cirrhosis, avoid electrolyte and acid/base imbalances that might lead to hepatic encephalopathy.

Kidney failure: combined triamterene and indomethacin therapy caused reversible acute kidney injury in some people.

Kidney stones: Use with caution in people with kidney stones.

Use should be avoided if the creatinine clearance is less than 10 ml/minute.

== Mechanism of action ==
Triamterene directly blocks the epithelial sodium channel (ENaC) on the lumen side of the kidney collecting tubule. Other diuretics cause a decrease in the sodium concentration of the forming urine due to the entry of sodium into the cell via the ENaC, and the concomitant exit of potassium from the principal cell into the forming urine. Blocking ENaC prevents this from happening. Amiloride works in the same way. Sodium channel blockers directly inhibit the entry of sodium into the sodium channels.

== With hydrochlorothiazide ==
Triamterene is commonly prepared in combination with hydrochlorothiazide for treatment of hypertension (high blood pressure) and edema (water retention). This combination is in a class of medications called diuretics or 'water pills', and causes the kidneys to get rid of the body's unneeded water and sodium through the urine.

== History ==
The triamterene ring system is found in many naturally occurring compounds, such as folic acid and riboflavin. The observation that the naturally occurring compound xanthopterin had renal affects led scientists at Smith Kline and French Laboratories in Philadelphia to begin a medicinal chemistry campaign to discover potential drugs, as part of a program to discover potassium-sparing diuretics. The first clinical studies were published in 1961 and the first trials combining it with hydrochlorothiazide were published the next year.

Smith Kline & French launched it as a single agent under the brand Dyrenium in 1964. The combination drug with hydrochlorothiazide, Dyazide, was first approved in the US in 1965 and the first generic, brought by Bolar Pharmaceutical Co., was approved in 1987. In 1986 Dyazide was the most prescribed drug in the US and had $325 million in sales, making it SmithKline Beckman's second-biggest seller behind Tagamet.

The patents had expired on Dyazide in 1980, but complications arose with the introductions of generics, because the formulation of Dyazide resulted in variable batches that made it impossible for generic manufacturers to show that their versions were bioequivalent.

Bolar Pharmaceutical was in the running to be the first to bring a generic, but its application was delayed by these concerns about whether its formulation provided the same amount of each drug; these were complicated by accusations that Bolar had fraudulently substituted Dyazide for its own version to conduct studies that were submitted to the FDA. Shortly after Bolar's generic was approved, further concerns were raised with regard to Bolar's applications to market generics more generally; these findings among others raised widespread concern among doctors and the public over whether generics were really the same as branded drugs. Bolar ended up recalling its generic form of Dyazide and withdrawing the product in 1990. In 1991 the US Justice Department on behalf of the FDA filed 20 criminal charges against Bolar for its fraud, and early the next year Bolar pled guilty and agreed to pay a $10M fine. Public concern over the safety of generic drugs was further exacerbated by a Congressional investigation into bribery at the FDA by generics companies that found pervasive corruption; the investigation had been spurred by the generics company Mylan, which had hired private investigators based on its beliefs that competitors were getting unfair advantages in getting their generics approved.

Mylan itself developed a version of a triamterene/hydrochlorothiazide combination drug after the Dyazide patent expired, and used a different, more stable formulation as well as different dosages of each active ingredient (50 mg hydrochlorothiazide and 75 mg triamterene, compared with Dyazide's 25 mg hydrochlorothiazide and 50 mg triamterene) so it had to get approval as a new drug, as opposed to a generic; their product was called Maxzide and was approved in 1984. The higher dose allowed once per day dosing, which Mylan and its marketing partner, Lederle, believed would help it compete against Dyazide, which had $210M in sales in 1983.

Mylan's patents on the drug were declared invalid in court, and its marketing exclusivity expired in 1987, prompting a rush of generic competition and litigation by two of them, American Therapeutics Inc. and Vitarine Pharmaceuticals, with the FDA. Vitarine, along with Par Pharmaceutical, were two of the companies that Mylan had targeted in its investigation into corruption and it turned out that Par and Vitarine had each used Mylan's Maxzide to obtain its bioequivalence data, leading both companies to withdraw its generic competitor to Mylan's product. Generics eventually entered the market.

== Research ==
While there is a lack of randomized controlled trials evaluating the use of triamterene in the treatment of Ménière's disease, the typical treatment is 37.5 mg of triamterene with 25 mg of hydrochlorothiazide 1–2 capsules daily. This recommendation was given a Strength of Recommendation Taxonomy (SORT) grade of C.
