= HECW1 =

Protein-coding gene in the species Homo sapiens

Identifiers
- Aliases: HECW1, NEDL1, HECT, C2 and WW domain containing E3 ubiquitin protein ligase 1
- External IDs: OMIM: 610384; MGI: 2444115; GeneCards: HECW1
Available structures
PDB	Ortholog search: PDBe RCSB
PDB	List of PDB id codes 3L4H
Enzyme activity
EC #	BRENDA	ExPASy	KEGG	MetaCyc
2.3.2.26	↗	↗	↗	↗

Gene location (Human)
Chr.	Chromosome 7 (human)
Band	7p14.1-p13	Start	43,112,629 bp
Band	7p14.1-p13	End	43,566,001 bp

Gene location (Mouse)
Chr.	Chromosome 13 (mouse)
Band	13 A1|13 5.29 cM	Start	14,401,023 bp
Band	13 A1|13 5.29 cM	End	14,697,813 bp
RNA expression pattern
Bgee	Human / Mouse (ortholog); Top expressed in: Brodmann area 23; middle temporal gyrus; endothelial cell; primary visual cortex; testicle; ganglionic eminence; prefrontal cortex; dorsolateral prefrontal cortex; superior frontal gyrus; pons / Top expressed in: medial dorsal nucleus; facial motor nucleus; primary motor cortex; anterior horn of spinal cord; central gray substance of midbrain; medial geniculate nucleus; medial vestibular nucleus; prefrontal cortex; trigeminal ganglion; lateral geniculate nucleus; More reference expression data
BioGPS	n/a
Gene ontology
Molecular function	transferase activity; ubiquitin-protein transferase activity; ubiquitin protein ligase activity
Cellular component	cytosol; cytoplasm
Biological process	negative regulation of canonical Wnt signaling pathway; protein ubiquitination; proteasome-mediated ubiquitin-dependent protein catabolic process; protein polyubiquitination; ubiquitin-dependent protein catabolic process; positive regulation of protein catabolic process; regulation of dendrite morphogenesis; negative regulation of sodium ion transmembrane transporter activity
Sources:Amigo / QuickGO
Orthologs
Databases	NCBI: entry; OMA: entry
Species	Human	Mouse
Entrez	23072	94253
Ensembl	ENSG00000002746	ENSMUSG00000021301
UniProt	Q76N89	Q8K4P8
RefSeq (mRNA)	NM_001287059; NM_015052	NM_001081348; NM_153130; NM_178809
RefSeq (protein)	NP_001273988; NP_055867	NP_001074817
Location (UCSC)	Chr 7: 43.11 – 43.57 Mb	Chr 13: 14.4 – 14.7 Mb
PubMed search
- Wikidata
View/Edit Human	View/Edit Mouse

HECT, C2 and WW domain containing E3 ubiquitin protein ligase 1 is a protein that in humans is encoded by the HECW1 gene. In human it has 1606 amino acids (179.5 kDa) and isoelectric point of 5.18.
