= NEDD4 =

Protein-coding gene in the species Homo sapiens

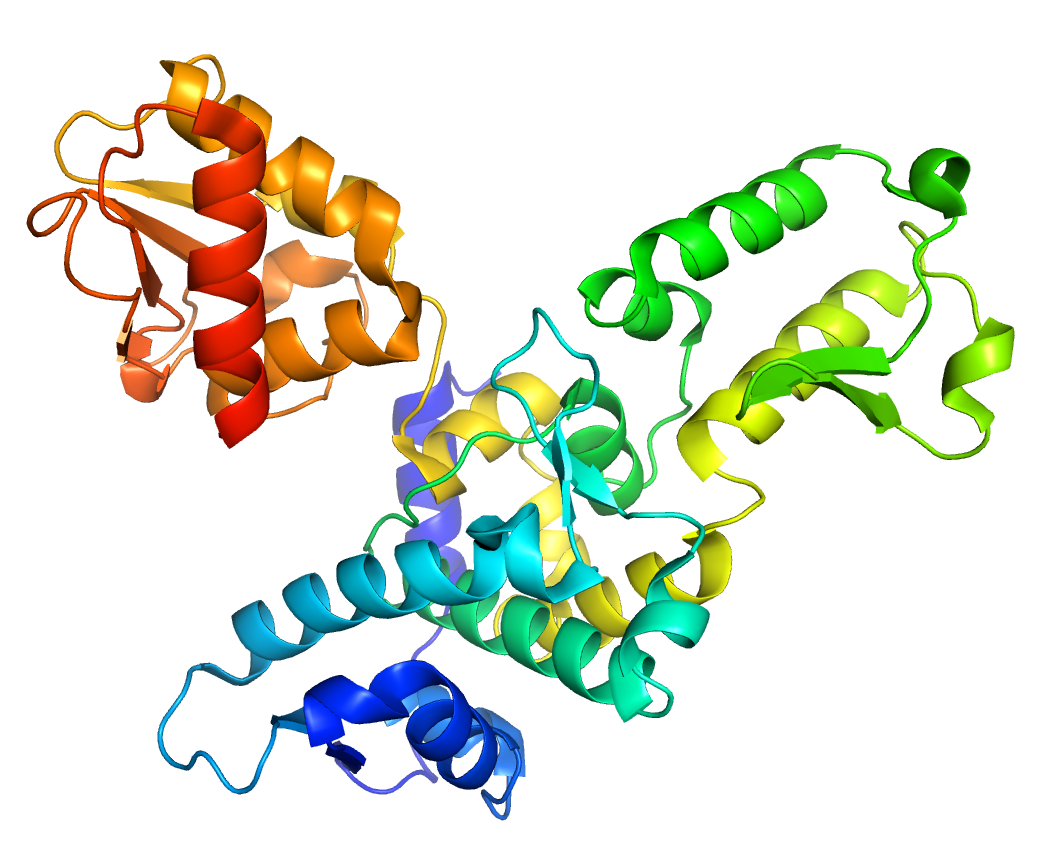

Identifiers
- Aliases: NEDD4, NEDD4-1, RPF1, neural precursor cell expressed, developmentally down-regulated 4, E3 ubiquitin protein ligase, NEDD4 E3 ubiquitin protein ligase
- External IDs: OMIM: 602278; MGI: 97297; GeneCards: NEDD4
Available structures
PDB	Ortholog search: PDBe RCSB
PDB	List of PDB id codes 2KPZ, 2KQ0, 2M3O, 2XBB, 2XBF, 3B7Y, 4BBN, 4BE8, 4N7F, 4N7H, 5C91, 5AHT, 5C7J
Enzyme activity
EC #	BRENDA	ExPASy	KEGG	MetaCyc
2.3.2.26	↗	↗	↗	↗

Gene location (Human)
Chr.	Chromosome 15 (human)
Band	15q21.3	Start	55,826,922 bp
Band	15q21.3	End	55,993,660 bp

Gene location (Mouse)
Chr.	Chromosome 9 (mouse)
Band	9 D|9 40.08 cM	Start	72,662,346 bp
Band	9 D|9 40.08 cM	End	72,749,852 bp
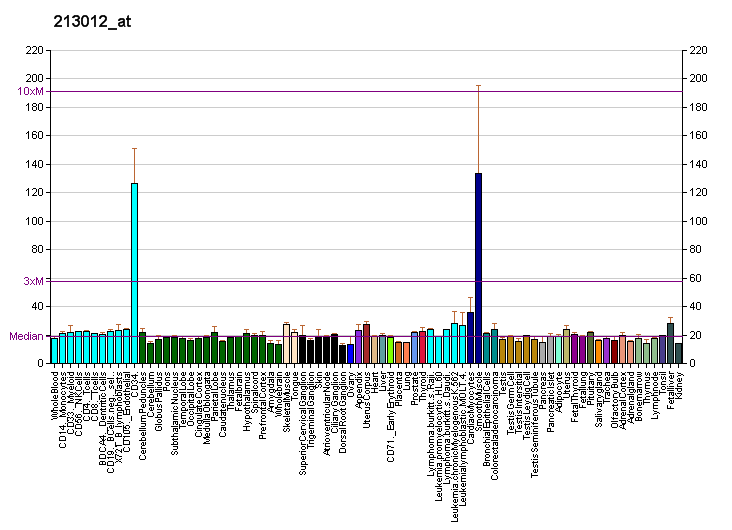
RNA expression pattern
Bgee	Human / Mouse (ortholog); Top expressed in: testicle; epithelium of colon; Skeletal muscle tissue of rectus abdominis; Achilles tendon; biceps brachii; vastus lateralis muscle; Skeletal muscle tissue of biceps brachii; thoracic diaphragm; glutes; gastrocnemius muscle / Top expressed in: efferent ductule; tail of embryo; vestibular membrane of cochlear duct; hand; primitive streak; genital tubercle; mandibular prominence; medullary collecting duct; maxillary prominence; abdominal wall; More reference expression data
BioGPS	More reference expression data
Gene ontology
Molecular function	protein domain specific binding; ubiquitin-protein transferase activity; sodium channel inhibitor activity; beta-2 adrenergic receptor binding; ubiquitin binding; protein binding; RNA polymerase binding; proline-rich region binding; phosphoserine residue binding; phosphothreonine residue binding; ionotropic glutamate receptor binding; transferase activity; ubiquitin protein ligase activity
Cellular component	cytoplasm; cytosol; Golgi apparatus; membrane; ubiquitin ligase complex; plasma membrane; apicolateral plasma membrane; cell cortex; perinuclear region of cytoplasm; chromatin; extracellular exosome; dendritic spine; glutamatergic synapse; postsynaptic cytosol
Biological process	protein targeting to lysosome; adaptive immune response; positive regulation of protein catabolic process; blood vessel morphogenesis; negative regulation of sodium ion transport; cellular response to UV; endocardial cushion development; negative regulation of vascular endothelial growth factor receptor signaling pathway; protein K63-linked ubiquitination; regulation of membrane potential; negative regulation of sodium ion transmembrane transporter activity; regulation of ion transmembrane transport; negative regulation of transcription from RNA polymerase II promoter in response to UV-induced DNA damage; outflow tract morphogenesis; receptor internalization; negative regulation of transcription by RNA polymerase II; protein monoubiquitination; receptor catabolic process; nervous system development; regulation of dendrite morphogenesis; response to calcium ion; positive regulation of nucleocytoplasmic transport; neuromuscular junction development; protein ubiquitination; regulation of potassium ion transmembrane transporter activity; lysosomal transport; ubiquitin-dependent protein catabolic process via the multivesicular body sorting pathway; positive regulation of phosphatidylinositol 3-kinase signaling; progesterone receptor signaling pathway; viral process; neuron projection development; regulation of synapse organization; T cell activation; regulation of macroautophagy; glucocorticoid receptor signaling pathway; protein polyubiquitination; ubiquitin-dependent protein catabolic process; proteasome-mediated ubiquitin-dependent protein catabolic process
Sources:Amigo / QuickGO
Orthologs
Databases	NCBI: entry; OMA: entry
Species	Human	Mouse
Entrez	4734	17999
Ensembl	ENSG00000069869	ENSMUSG00000032216
UniProt	P46934	P46935
RefSeq (mRNA)	NM_001284338; NM_001284339; NM_001284340; NM_006154; NM_198400 NM_001329212	NM_010890
RefSeq (protein)	NP_001271267; NP_001271268; NP_001271269; NP_001316141; NP_006145 NP_940682	NP_035020; NP_001344927
Location (UCSC)	Chr 15: 55.83 – 55.99 Mb	Chr 9: 72.66 – 72.75 Mb
PubMed search
- Wikidata
View/Edit Human	View/Edit Mouse

E3 ubiquitin-protein ligase NEDD4, also known as neural precursor cell expressed developmentally down-regulated protein 4 (whence "NEDD4") is an enzyme that is, in humans, encoded by the NEDD4 gene.

NEDD4 is an E3 ubiquitin ligase enzyme, that targets proteins for ubiquitination. NEDD4 is, in eukaryotes, a highly conserved gene, and the founding member of the NEDD4 family of E3 HECT ubiquitin ligases, which in humans consists of 9 members:

- NEDD4 (the core topic of this article)
- NEDD4-2 (or NEDD4L)
- ITCH
- SMURF1
- SMURF2
- WWP1
- WWP2
- NEDL1 (HECW1)
- NEDDL2 (HECW2)].

NEDD4 regulates a large number of membrane proteins, such as ion channels and membrane receptors, via ubiquitination and endocytosis; its eponymous protein is widely expressed, and a large number of proteins have been predicted or demonstrated to bind in vitro.

In vivo, it is involved in the regulation of a diverse range of processes, including

- insulin-like growth factor signalling,
- neuronal architecture, and
- viral budding.

NEDD4 also is an essential protein in animals, both for development and for survival.

== Structure ==
The NEDD4 protein has a modular structure that is shared among the NEDD4 family, consisting of an amino-terminal C2 calcium-dependent phospholipid binding domain, 3-4 WW protein-protein interaction domains, and a carboxyl-terminal catalytic HECT ubiquitin ligase domain. The C2 domain targets proteins to the phospholipid membrane, and can also be involved in targeting substrates. The WW domains interact with proline rich PPxY motifs in target proteins to mediate interactions with substrates and adaptors. The catalytic HECT domain forms a thioester bond with activated ubiquitin transferred from an E2 ubiquitin conjugating enzyme, before transferring ubiquitin directly to a specific substrate.

== Expression ==
The human NEDD4 gene is located on chromosome 15q21.3, and consists of 30 exons that transcribe five protein variants of NEDD4, all of which vary in the C2 domain but share 100% identity from the first WW domain through to the end of the protein. The mouse Nedd4 gene is located on chromosome 9. NEDD4 is a 120kDa protein that is expressed in most tissues, including brain, heart, lung, kidney, and skeletal muscle. The NEDD4 protein localizes to the cytoplasm, mainly in the perinuclear region and cytoplasmic periphery.

== Function ==
In vitro, NEDD4 has been shown to bind and ubiquitinate a number of ion channels and membrane transporters resulting in their subsequent endocytosis and degradation by the proteasome, including the epithelial sodium channel (ENaC), voltage-gated calcium and voltage-gated sodium channels.

NEDD4 mediates ubiquitination and subsequent down-regulation of components of the epidermal growth factor (EGF) signalling pathway, such as HER3 and HER4 EGF receptors, and ACK.

The fibroblast growth factor receptor 1 (FGFR1) undergoes NEDD4 mediated ubiquitination and down-regulation, and contains a novel site (VL***PSR) that binds the C2 and WW3 domain of NEDD4.

There is a role for NEDD4 in viral budding via ubiquitination of viral matrix proteins for a number of viruses, and NEDD4 also interacts with components of the endocytic machinery required for budding.

NEDD4 can also function independently of its ubiquitin ligase activity. NEDD4 interacts with VEGFR2, leading to the degradation of VEGFR2 irrespective of whether the HECT domain is catalytically active.

NEDD4 can bind and ubiquitinate the epithelial sodium channel (ENaC), leading to down-regulation of sodium channel activity. However, in vivo studies have implicated the NEDD4 family member NEDD4-2 as the main ligase responsible for ENaC regulation.

== Regulation ==
NEDD4 activity can be regulated by auto-inhibition, whereby the C2 domain binds to the HECT domain to create an inhibitory conformation of the protein. This auto-inhibitory conformation can be disrupted by the presence of calcium, by proteins that bind to NEDD4 to prevent this conformation, or by phosphorylation of NEDD4 at specific tyrosine residues to activate NEDD4 ubiquitin ligase activity.

The NDFIP1 and NDFIP2 proteins function as adaptor proteins that can facilitate NEDD4 binding to substrates that lack PY motifs, as well as a role in binding NEDD4 to abrogate auto-inhibition. NDFIP1 may also regulate NEDD4 recruitment to exosomes for secretion.

Oxidative stress induces the activation of NEDD4 transcription via the FOXM1B transcription factor. Ras signalling also up-regulates NEDD4 transcription.

== Physiological significance ==
In vivo, NEDD4 is involved in the regulation of insulin and insulin-like growth factor (IGF-1) signalling by regulating the amount of insulin receptor (IR) and insulin-like growth factor 1 receptor (IGF-1R) on the cell surface.

The deletion of NEDD4 in mice leads to a reduced number of effector T-cells, and a slower T-cell response to antigen, suggesting that NEDD4 may function to convert naïve T-cells into activated T-cells.

NEDD4 plays an important role in neuronal development, and is responsible for the formation and arborisation of dendrites in neurons by forming a signalling complex with TINK and Rap2A. It is also required for proper formation and function of neuromuscular junctions, and normal numbers of cranial neural crest cells, motor neurons and axons.

NEDD4 has been shown to interact with and ubiquitinate the tumour suppressor protein PTEN in vitro, resulting in PTEN proteasomal degradation or trafficking. The in vivo role of NEDD4 in PTEN regulation is less clear. There is some evidence from NEDD4 deficient mice that NEDD4 does not target PTEN for degradation or trafficking. However, in other in vivo models, and in many human cancer cell lines, NEDD4 does appear responsible for the degradation of PTEN. NEDD4 regulation of PTEN may only occur in specific biological contexts.

The role of NEDD4 in negatively regulating tumour suppressor proteins is consistent with the frequent overexpression of NEDD4 in many different types of human cancers. Decreased levels of NEDD4 have also been associated with some cancers, including neuroblastoma and pancreatic cancer where the NEDD4 directly targets the respective oncoproteins N-Myc and c-Myc associated with these cancers for degradation.

== Viral budding ==
NEDD4 may be hijacked by viral proteins (for example, by UL56 from Herpes simplex virus 2, or by protein VP40 from Ebola virus. Such infection aids viruses in taking over the ESCRT pathway which is essential for successful budding of the virions from the plasma membrane. The hijacking mechanisms operate by exploiting evolution, the chemical evolution of (viral) genes coding for traits that exploit a short linear motif mimicry. In the case of NEDD4, viral proteins mimic the PPxY recognition motif of WW domains that are part of NEDD4.
