= EAST syndrome =

- Other names: SeSAME syndrome
- Pronunciation: /iːst/

EAST syndrome is a syndrome consisting of epilepsy, ataxia (a movement disorder), sensorineural deafness (deafness because of problems with the hearing nerve) and salt-wasting renal tubulopathy (salt loss caused by kidney problems). The tubulopathy (renal tubule abnormalities) in this condition predispose to hypokalemic (low potassium) metabolic alkalosis with normal blood pressure. Hypomagnesemia (low blood levels of magnesium) may also be present.

EAST syndrome is also called SeSAME syndrome, as a syndrome of seizures, sensorineural deafness, ataxia, intellectual disability (mental retardation), and electrolyte imbalances. It is an autosomal recessive genetic disorder caused by mutations in the KCNJ10 gene, as discovered by Bockenhauer and co-workers. The KCNJ10 gene encodes the K+ channel Kir4.1 (allowing K+ to flow into a cell rather than out) and is present in the brain, ear, and kidney.

== Symptoms and signs ==
=== Mutations ===
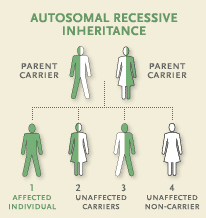
Representation of autosomal recessive disease

Many mutations that are found within EAST syndrome lead to a change in pH sensitivity and a modification in the IC50 value to the alkaline range, which is a higher pH reading. A specific KCNJ10 mutation, R65P, is affected by this shift. Its activity is greatly decreased when exposed to the intracellular pH. This causes more H+ sensitivity within humans, which means that the pH level is then shifted into the basic range. There are still many other mutations such as R175Q, T164I, and R297C that also cause changes in the pH sensitivity. These mutations also have decreased sensitivity when they are exposed to physiological intracellular pH.

=== Epilepsy ===
Epilepsy is caused by the mutation KCNJ10 within EAST syndrome. Glial cells express KCNJ10, which establishes the neuronal cells resting membrane potential. Therefore, through repolarization, a neuron constantly takes up sodium, which causes the membrane potential to decrease because potassium is no longer being taken up intracellularly. Seizures occur because the KCNJ10 mutation increases the sodium uptake and decreases the potassium uptake, which means the protective barrier of potassium is no longer there.

Some signs of epilepsy can be temporary confusion, a staring spell, or uncontrollable movements of the arms and legs. A person may also experience a loss of consciousness or psychic symptoms. Someone with epilepsy typically has the same type of seizure each time one occurs and so the symptoms are also similar each time.

The treatments of epilepsy vary depending on the case. Some treatments include medications, surgery, therapies, or a ketogenic diet.

=== Ataxia ===
Ataxia can develop very abruptly or it can develop over time. Some signs and symptoms of ataxia are loss of balance, loss of muscle coordination in an arm, hand, or leg, difficulty walking, slur of speech, or difficulty swallowing. Ataxia is a non-specific condition characterized by a lack of voluntary movements to some degree. Rather than involving damage to the cerebellum, ataxia in EAST syndrome is due to the KCNJ10 mutation. In the brain, KCNJ10 is expressed in glial cells surrounding synapses and blood vessels as a K+ ion buffer. K+ is necessary to maintain a neuronal cell's membrane potential, and these glial cells are responsible for transferring K+ ions from sites of excess K+ to sites with deficient K+. KCNJ10 is a major potassium channel in these glial cells, and when this gene is mutated, these glial cells cannot properly clear K+ from the extracellular space and deliver K+ ions to places that need it. Excess K+ in these areas of synapse disturbs physiological excitability, resulting in symptoms of ataxia.

The treatment of ataxia depends on the cause, and there is not current research for EAST syndrome specific treatment; however, there are some general ways to improve disability from ataxia. The movement disorders associated with ataxia can be managed by pharmacological treatments and through physical therapy and occupational therapy to reduce disability. Physical therapy treatment is highly dependent on each individual and varies. A recent review states that physical therapy is effective, however, there is only moderate evidence to support this.

=== Sensorineural deafness ===
When a person shows signs of sensorineural deafness there is usually muffling of speech, difficulty understanding words, especially against background noise or in a crowd of people. A person might also frequently ask others to speak more slowly, clearly and loudly. They might also withdraw from conversations or avoid some social settings because everything sounds muffled, even when there are loud noises. Sensorineural Deafness indicates that the patient has difficulty hearing not due to environmental factors, but through genetic mutation in the KCNJ10 gene. This gene affects the potassium channel count and their productivity in several parts of the body.

Cochlea crossection

Since the main mutation for EAST syndrome is in the KCNJ10 gene, it affects the potassium channels found in the inner ear cells. This includes the stria vascularis region of the inner ear, which is the upper portion of the fluid filled spiral ligament of the cochlea. The cochlea is the main region that translates sound waves into neurological signals to be interpreted by the brain. Without properly functioning potassium channel, the potassium conductance is reduced, which is critical for maintaining the endocochlear functioning properly. This implies that more potassium ions leave rather than going into the cell. This causes a lack of sound wave translation into neurological signals, which the brain is unable to understand or interpret. Potassium is also necessary on hair cells, which are mainly under concentration in the endolymph, which is an inner ear fluid membrane. Without the use of potassium channels or entry of potassium in appropriate regions, there is a lack of signal transduction that help with processing sounds.

Even though sensorineural deafness is irreversible, one treatment are cochlear implants, which includes a microphone and electronic devices that sit externally to the head. When sound is emitted to the microphone, it converts the sound waves into electrical impulses. In contrast to hearing aids, which amplify sound, cochlear implants are designed to stimulate the auditory nerve.

=== Tubulopathy ===
Tubulopathy is represented by the T in the acronym EAST syndrome. This is a renal salt wasting tubulopathy involved in the kidneys. The mutation involved in EAST syndrome causes subnormal absorption of certain ions such as Na+, Ca2+, and Mg2+. The KCNJ10 gene is associated with a K+ channel in the distal convoluted tubule and the connecting tubule, two specific regions of the kidneys. These regions play a role in the excretion and absorption of salts. The KCNJ10 is an inwardly rectifying potassium channel which means it is important in the recycling of K+ believed to further be useful in building a gradient for Na+/K+ - ATPase's. In addition to diminishing Na+/K+ - ATPase's inadequate KCNJ10 functioning leads to depolarization of the basolateral membrane which reduces electrogenic transporters' driving force. The lack of Na+ typically leads to the low blood pressure typical of EAST syndrome patients. The salt wasting tubulopathy of EAST syndrome most closely resembles that of Gitelman syndrome which is the most common syndrome affecting the distal convoluted tubule.

== Management ==
EAST syndrome is an autosomal recessive disorder; therefore, it cannot necessarily be prevented. Presence of the four symptoms (epilepsy, ataxia, sensorineural deafness, and salt-wasting renal tubulopathy) and detection of a mutation in the KCNJ10 gene would indicate the presence of this disorder.

There is not yet one method to help EAST syndrome as a whole, but hopefully with continued research, there could be one day.

== See also ==
- Gitelman syndrome
- Bartter syndrome
- Liddle's syndrome
