= Hypomagnesemia with secondary hypocalcemia =

- Other names: Familial primary hypomagnesemia with hypocalcuria
- Specialty: Endocrinology

Hypomagnesemia with secondary hypocalcemia (HSH) is an autosomal recessive genetic disorder that affects the absorption of magnesium in the intestines. It is characterized by reduced reabsorption of magnesium from our diet in the intestines, leading to decreased levels of magnesium in the bloodstream. This, in turn, causes a decrease in the production of parathyroid hormone (PTH) by the parathyroid gland. Consequently, there is a decrease in both PTH and serum calcium levels, resulting in secondary hypocalcemia.

One of the main symptoms of HSH is the occurrence of convulsions and spasms in early infancy. If left untreated, these symptoms can potentially lead to intellectual disability or even death. HSH is primarily caused by mutations in the TRPM6 gene, which plays a crucial role in maintaining the balance of magnesium in the body.

== Pathophysiology ==
HSH is primarily caused by a reduction in intestinal magnesium reabsorption. Intestinal magnesium reabsorption primarily occurs by membrane transport through the TRPM6 ion channels and is crucial for magnesium homeostasis. TRPM6 is expressed on the part of the cell membrane facing the intestinal lumen on intestinal cells, known as enterocytes. It acts as an ion channel to allow the ions (charged atoms) of magnesium (Mg^{2+}) and calcium (Ca^{2+}) to flow into the cell. It generates “outwardly-rectifying" currents, and as a result a positive charge will then pass more easily in the outward direction, out the cell, than in the inward direction, into the cell. The outward portion of these currents consist of sodium (Na^{+}), while the inward portion is composed of the divalent cations: magnesium and calcium. The entry of sodium ions is blocked by extracellular divalent cations. Additionally, increased levels of intracellular magnesium lead to a decrease in current through TRPM6 channels.

More than 30 mutations in the TRPM6 gene have been identified as being associated with HSH. These mutations are scattered throughout the gene (refer to Table 1). Out of the eight HSH mutations that have been tested, none have been shown to produce whole-cell current. One notable missense mutation, S141L, inhibits coassembly with TRPM7, as well as other TRPM6 subunits, and fails to allow traffic of the channel to the cell membrane. The trafficking ability and coassembly of other mutant forms of TRPM6 have yet to be extensively studied and require further investigation.

While hypomagnesemia in patients with HSH directly results from TRPM6 mutations, hypocalcemia is an indirect and secondary consequence. Decreased serum magnesium levels result to reduced the secretion of parathyroid hormone (PTH) by the parathyroid gland. PTH plays a vital role in regulating serum calcium levels. Decreased levels of PTH result in a decrease in the availability of calcium in the bloodstream, which contributes to the neurological symptoms observed in HSH.

Table 1: TRPM6 mutations associated with hypomagnesemia with secondary hypocalcemia
Mutation		Location	Functional?	Reference
Nucleotide	Amino acid	Location	Functional?	Reference
c.C166T	R56X	N-terminus		
c.C422T	S141L	N-terminus	No	^{,}^{,}^{,}
c.G469T	E157X	N-terminus		
c.T521G	I174R	N-terminus		
c.668delA	D223fsX263	N-terminus		
c.1010+5G→C	Splicing	N-terminus		
c.A1060C	T354P	N-terminus		
c.1134+5G→A	Splicing	N-terminus		
c.1208-1G→A	Splicing	N-terminus		
c.1280delA	H427fsX429	N-terminus	No	^{,}
c.1308+1G→A	Splicing	N-terminus		
c.C1437A	Y479X	N-terminus		
c.C1450T	R484X	N-terminus		
c.C1769G	S590X	N-terminus	No	^{,}^{,}
c.del1796-1797	P599fsX609	N-terminus		
c.2009+1G→A	Splicing	N-terminus		^{,}
c.G2120A	C707Y	N-terminus		
c.2207delG	R736fsX737	N-terminus	No	^{,}^{,}
c.2537-2A→T	Splicing	N-terminus		
c.2667+1G→A	Splicing			^{,}
c.C2782T	R928X	M3	No	
c.del Ex 21		M4		
c.Del2831-2832insG	I944fsX959	M4-M5		
c.3209-68A→G	Splicing			
c.del Ex 22 + 23		M5-6		
C.3537-1G→A	Splicing			^{,}
c.3779-91del	Q1260fsX1283	C-terminus		^{,}
c.del Ex 25 - 27		C-terminus		
c.del Ex 26	Y1533X	C-terminus	No	
c.5017-18delT	L1673fsX1675	C-terminus	No	
c.del Ex 31 + 32		C-terminus	No	
c.5057+2T→C	Splicing	C-terminus		
c.A5775G	Splicing	C-terminus		

== Diagnosis ==
Diagnosis typically occurs during the first six months of life due to the characteristic neurological symptoms. These symptoms include muscle spasms, tetany, and seizures. Laboratory testing reveals hypomagnesemia (decreased serum magnesium levels), hypocalcemia (decreased serum calcium levels), and little to no measurable PTH levels. Diagnosis is confirmed with these symptoms and can be further solidified with genetic sequencing of the TRPM6 gene.

== Treatment ==
Treatment of HSH involves administration of high doses of magnesium salts. These salts may be taken orally or otherwise (e.g. subcutaneously). This treatment works by increasing magnesium absorption through the non-TRPM6 mediated paracellular transport pathways. This treatment must be continued throughout life.

== History ==
HSH was originally believed to be an X-linked disorder due to the preponderance of affected males. With the finding that mutations in TRPM6 (on chromosome 9) are causative for the disorder this is no longer the case. Of recent interest, however, is the characterization of a patient with symptoms similar to HSH who has a translocation of the chromosomes 9 and X.

== See also ==
- Bartter's syndrome
- Gitelman syndrome
- Hypomagnesemia
- Hypocalcemia
