= CLCNKA =

Protein-coding gene in humans

Identifiers
- Aliases: CLCNKA, CLCK1, ClC-K1, hClC-Ka, chloride voltage-gated channel Ka
- External IDs: OMIM: 602024; MGI: 1930643; GeneCards: CLCNKA
Available structures
PDB	Ortholog search: PDBe RCSB
PDB	List of PDB id codes 2PFI

Gene location (Human)
Chr.	Chromosome 1 (human)
Band	1p36.13	Start	16,018,875 bp
Band	1p36.13	End	16,034,050 bp

Gene location (Mouse)
Chr.	Chromosome 4 (mouse)
Band	4|4 D3	Start	141,131,664 bp
Band	4|4 D3	End	141,143,325 bp
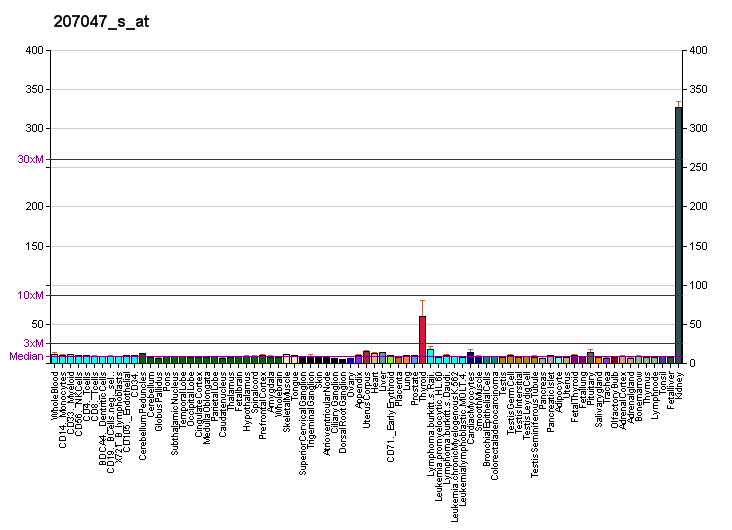
RNA expression pattern
Bgee	Human / Mouse (ortholog); Top expressed in: left lobe of thyroid gland; right lobe of thyroid gland; pituitary gland; anterior pituitary; body of pancreas; human kidney; right adrenal cortex; testicle; right hemisphere of cerebellum; body of stomach / Top expressed in: blastocyst; right kidney; inner renal medulla; human kidney; outer renal medulla; inner stripe of outer renal medulla; submandibular gland; connecting tubule; distal tubule; morula; More reference expression data
BioGPS	More reference expression data
Gene ontology
Molecular function	metal ion binding; voltage-gated ion channel activity; chloride channel activity; voltage-gated chloride channel activity; identical protein binding
Cellular component	integral component of membrane; plasma membrane; integral component of plasma membrane; chloride channel complex; membrane
Biological process	ion transmembrane transport; chloride transport; excretion; regulation of ion transmembrane transport; ion transport; transmembrane transport; chloride transmembrane transport
Sources:Amigo / QuickGO
Orthologs
Databases	NCBI: entry; OMA: entry
Species	Human	Mouse
Entrez	1187	56365
Ensembl	ENSG00000186510	ENSMUSG00000006216
UniProt	P51800	Q9WUB6
RefSeq (mRNA)	NM_004070; NM_001042704; NM_001257139	NM_019701
RefSeq (protein)	NP_001036169; NP_001244068; NP_004061	NP_062675
Location (UCSC)	Chr 1: 16.02 – 16.03 Mb	Chr 4: 141.13 – 141.14 Mb
PubMed search
- Wikidata
View/Edit Human	View/Edit Mouse

Chloride channel protein ClC-Ka is a protein that in humans is encoded by the CLCNKA gene. Multiple transcript variants encoding different isoforms have been found for this gene.

== Function ==
This gene is a member of the CLC family of voltage-gated chloride channels. The encoded protein is predicted to have 12 transmembrane domains, and requires a beta subunit called barttin to form a functional channel. It is thought to function in salt reabsorption in the kidney and potassium recycling in the inner ear. The gene is highly similar to CLCNKB, which is located 10 kb downstream from this gene.

== Gene variants ==
CLCNKA encodes one of the two major chloride channels found in the kidney, the ClC-Ka channel (the other class being the ClC-Kb from CLCNKB). The CLCNKA gene is subject, like all genes, to variation due to single-nucleotide polymorphisms (SNPs), in which a single base (A, T, C, or G) is randomly replaced by another base. SNPs in the coding regions of CLCKNA may have consequent changes in the amino acid sequence of the ClC-Ka chloride channel leading to altered functional capacities and subsequent physiological alterations.

Four SNPs (rs848307, rs1739843, rs1010069, and rs1805152) have been associated with increased salt-sensitivity by displaying an irregularly large increase in blood pressure following modest salt (Na^{+}) intake, despite regular heart rate, blood pressure, and plasma renin levels before the salt ingestion. Of particular interest is a common SNP leading to the amino acid Arginine at the 83rd position to be replaced by Glycine. This variant is found to exist in approximately half of all caucasians, while a quarter of caucasians are homozygous for the allele. Although mainly studied in the context of caucasians, the SNP actually exists with a greater frequency in people of African descent, where the gene frequency is 70%. This SNP (rs10927887) was originally implicated in congestive heart failure after investigations into the heat shock protein HSPB7 showed that the CLCNKA gene was in linkage disequilibrium, meaning that the two genes are often not separated during recombination. The CLCNKA variant was then shown to be the cause of the pathology.

== Pathology ==
The four SNPs found to be associated with salt sensitivity consequently predispose such cardiovascular problems as left ventricular hypertrophy and dysfunction of the endothelium. The Arg83Gly SNP specifically results in a large reduction in the flow of chloride ions through the ClC-Ka channel in the thin and thick ascending limb of the nephrons. Experimentally, the membrane potential at which the channels show no net movement of ions at a given chloride concentration drops significantly with the mutation, indicating altered function in situ. This manifests as a chronic salt wasting disorder similar to Bartter syndrome, as sodium reabsorption is coupled with chloride reabsorption. The salt loss results in a decreased blood volume and consequently hyperreninemia leading (via the end product angiotensin II and aldosterone) to increased vascular tone, heart rate, water reabsorption, and blood pressure, collectively referred to as cardiorenal syndrome. Being heterozygous for this Arg83Gly variant increases the risk of heart failure by 27%, while homozygosity increases the risk by 54%. The additive stress on the heart from increased blood pressure and heart rate often only manifests as a pathology with an additional cardiovascular problem such as hypertension. Treatment for the SNP associated hyperreninemia involves drugs to block the Renin-Angiotensin-Aldosterone system to relieve the aforementioned stresses on the heart.

== See also ==
- Chloride channel
- BSND, barttin, accessory subunit beta for this channel
