= FHH =

FHH could stand for:

- Familial hypocalciuric hypercalcemia
- Frederick Health Hospital, Maryland, United States
- The Free and Hanseatic City of Hamburg, Germany
- Freightliner Heavy Haul, rail freight and logistics company headquartered in the United Kingdom
- Calcium-sensing receptor, so named FHH as a causative agent of familial hypocalciuric hypercalcemia
