= Mir-802 microRNA precursor family =

mir-802

Identifiers
- Symbol: mir-802
- Rfam: RF00887
- miRBase family: MIPF0000353

Other data
- RNA type: microRNA
- Domain: Eukaryota;
- PDB structures: PDBe

In molecular biology mir-802 microRNA is a short RNA molecule. MicroRNAs function to regulate the expression levels of other genes by several mechanisms.

== ROMK channels and caveolin-1 suppression ==
miR-802 expression in the kidney is stimulated by a high potassium intake, along with caveolin-1 expression, one of the many miR-802 protein targets. Surface expression of Renal Outer Medullary Potassium (ROMK) channels has been found to be enhanced in the plasma membrane of the distal nephron of the kidney by miR-802 expression. Caveolin-1 conversely inhibits ROMK channel activity, and expression of the two shows a clear inverse relationship. Co-expression of miR-802 with caveolin-1 blocks miR-802's upregulatory effects on ROMK channels. miR-802 thus functions to mediate the stimulatory effect of a high potassium diet on ROMK activity through suppression of caveolin-1 expression, this leading to an increased surface expression of ROMK channels.

== Human chromosome 21 ==
Human chromosome 21 (Hsa21) has been found to harbour over 400 different genes, with miR-802 among these. Along with miRNAs-99a, -125b-2, -155 and let-7c, miR-802 is overexpressed in brain and heart specimens of Down syndrome individuals, resulting in suppression of specific target proteins. This suppression in turn contributes towards the common phenotypic alterations observed in patients with Down syndrome.
