= KCNJ10 =

Protein-coding gene in humans

Identifiers
- Aliases: KCNJ10, BIRK-10, KCNJ13-PEN, KIR1.2, KIR4.1, SESAME, potassium voltage-gated channel subfamily J member 10, potassium inwardly rectifying channel subfamily J member 10
- External IDs: OMIM: 602208; MGI: 1194504; GeneCards: KCNJ10

Gene location (Human)
| Chr. | Chromosome 1 (human) |
| Band | 1q23.2 | Start | 159,998,651 bp |
| Band | 1q23.2 | End | 160,070,160 bp |

Gene location (Mouse)
| Chr. | Chromosome 1 (mouse) |
| Band | 1 H3|1 79.69 cM | Start | 172,168,777 bp |
| Band | 1 H3|1 79.69 cM | End | 172,201,652 bp |
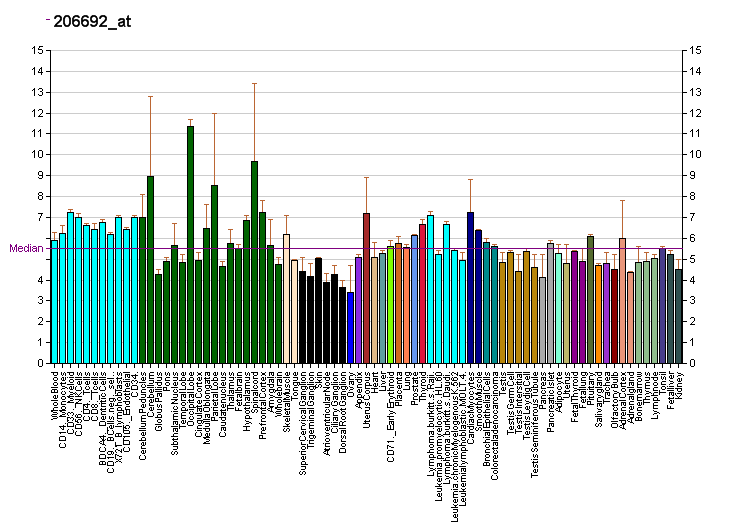
RNA expression pattern
| Bgee | Human / Mouse (ortholog); Top expressed in: C1 segment; internal globus pallidus; inferior ganglion of vagus nerve; external globus pallidus; pars reticulata; subthalamic nucleus; nucleus accumbens; endothelial cell; caudate nucleus; pars compacta / Top expressed in: deep cerebellar nuclei; mammillary body; medial vestibular nucleus; lateral geniculate nucleus; dorsal tegmental nucleus; medial dorsal nucleus; superior colliculus; substantia nigra; suprachiasmatic nucleus; ventromedial nucleus; More reference expression data |
| BioGPS | More reference expression data |
Gene ontology
| Molecular function | nucleotide binding; potassium channel activity; voltage-gated ion channel activity; protein binding; ATP-activated inward rectifier potassium channel activity; ATP binding; G-protein activated inward rectifier potassium channel activity; inward rectifier potassium channel activity |
| Cellular component | integral component of membrane; membrane; plasma membrane; integral component of plasma membrane; basolateral plasma membrane; presynapse |
| Biological process | regulation of long-term neuronal synaptic plasticity; central nervous system myelination; regulation of membrane potential; regulation of ion transmembrane transport; ion transport; potassium ion transport; potassium ion homeostasis; potassium ion transmembrane transport; glutamate reuptake; regulation of resting membrane potential; oligodendrocyte development; visual perception; adult walking behavior; potassium ion import across plasma membrane |
Sources:Amigo / QuickGO
Orthologs
| Databases | NCBI: entry; OMA: entry |
| Species | Human | Mouse |
| Entrez | 3766 | 16513 |
| Ensembl | ENSG00000177807 | ENSMUSG00000044708 |
| UniProt | P78508 | Q9JM63 |
| RefSeq (mRNA) | NM_002241 | NM_001039484; NM_020269 |
| RefSeq (protein) | NP_002232 | NP_001034573 |
| Location (UCSC) | Chr 1: 160 – 160.07 Mb | Chr 1: 172.17 – 172.2 Mb |
| PubMed search |
- Wikidata
| View/Edit Human | View/Edit Mouse |

ATP-sensitive inward rectifier potassium channel 10 is a protein that in humans is encoded by the KCNJ10 gene.

== Function ==
This gene encodes a member of the inward rectifier-type potassium channel family, K_{ir}4.1, characterized by having a greater tendency to allow potassium to flow into, rather than out of, a cell. K_{ir}4.1, may form a heterodimer with another potassium channel protein and may be responsible for the potassium buffering action of glial cells in the brain. Mutations in this gene have been associated with seizure susceptibility of common idiopathic generalized epilepsy syndromes.

== EAST syndrome ==
Humans with mutations in the KCNJ10 gene that cause loss of function in related K^{+} channels can display epilepsy, ataxia, sensorineural deafness and tubulopathy, the EAST syndrome (Gitelman syndrome phenotype) reflecting roles for KCNJ10 gene products in the brain, inner ear and kidney. The K_{ir}4.1 channel is expressed in the stria vascularis and is essential for formation of the endolymph, the fluid that surrounds the mechanosensitive stereocilia of the sensory hair cells that make hearing possible.

== Rett Syndrome ==
Rett syndrome is a neurological disorder characterized by a mutation in the MeCP2 gene. This mutation results in less MeCP2. KCNJ10 expression is upregulated by the transcription factor MeCP2. MeCP2 deficiency leads to less Kir4.1 channels present on astrocytes in the brain. Since there are fewer channels allowing potassium into the cells, extracellular potassium levels are higher. Higher extracellular potassium leaves neurons more easily excitable which could contribute to the epilepsy observed in many Rett Syndrome patients.

== Interactions ==
KCNJ10 has been shown to interact with Interleukin 16.

== See also ==
- Inward-rectifier potassium ion channel
