= CNNM2 =

Protein-coding gene in humans

Identifiers
- Aliases: CNNM2, ACDP2, HOMG6, HOMGSMR, cyclin and CBS domain divalent metal cation transport mediator 2
- External IDs: OMIM: 607803; MGI: 2151054; GeneCards: CNNM2
Available structures
PDB	Ortholog search: PDBe RCSB
PDB	List of PDB id codes 4IY0, 4IY2, 4IY4, 4IYS

Gene location (Human)
Chr.	Chromosome 10 (human)
Band	10q24.32	Start	102,918,294 bp
Band	10q24.32	End	103,090,222 bp

Gene location (Mouse)
Chr.	Chromosome 19 (mouse)
Band	19 C3|19 38.97 cM	Start	46,750,035 bp
Band	19 C3|19 38.97 cM	End	46,868,631 bp
RNA expression pattern
Bgee	Human / Mouse (ortholog); Top expressed in: secondary oocyte; right adrenal gland; sural nerve; right adrenal cortex; Epithelium of choroid plexus; left adrenal gland; left adrenal cortex; popliteal artery; tibial arteries; middle temporal gyrus / Top expressed in: zygote; habenula; secondary oocyte; primary oocyte; right kidney; brown adipose tissue; primary visual cortex; superior frontal gyrus; proximal tubule; lumbar subsegment of spinal cord; More reference expression data
BioGPS	n/a
Gene ontology
Molecular function	ATP binding; magnesium ion transmembrane transporter activity; transmembrane transporter activity
Cellular component	integral component of membrane; plasma membrane; basolateral plasma membrane; membrane; intracellular membrane-bounded organelle
Biological process	magnesium ion transport; ion transport; magnesium ion homeostasis; magnesium ion transmembrane transport; transmembrane transport
Sources:Amigo / QuickGO
Orthologs
Databases	NCBI: entry; OMA: entry
Species	Human	Mouse
Entrez	54805	94219
Ensembl	ENSG00000148842	ENSMUSG00000064105
UniProt	Q9H8M5	Q3TWN3
RefSeq (mRNA)	NM_017649; NM_199076; NM_199077	NM_001102471; NM_033569
RefSeq (protein)	NP_060119; NP_951058; NP_951059	NP_001095941; NP_291047
Location (UCSC)	Chr 10: 102.92 – 103.09 Mb	Chr 19: 46.75 – 46.87 Mb
PubMed search
- Wikidata
View/Edit Human	View/Edit Mouse

Metal transporter CNNM2 is a protein in humans that is encoded by the gene CNNM2. This protein is also called Cyclin M2, but it has no cyclin-like function in the body.

This gene encodes a member of the ancient conserved domain containing protein family. Members of this protein family (CNNM1, CNNM2, CNNM3 and CNNM4) contain a cyclin box motif and have structural similarity to the cyclins. The encoded protein may play an important role in magnesium homeostasis by mediating the epithelial transport and renal reabsorption of Mg2+. Mutations in this gene are associated with renal hypomagnesemia. Alternatively spliced transcript variants encoding multiple isoforms have been observed for this gene.
