= Tubulopathy =

- Specialty: Nephrology

Tubulopathy is a disease affecting the renal tubules of the nephron.

Tubulopathic processes may be inflammatory or noninflammatory, though inflammatory processes are often referred to specifically as tubulitis.

Characteristics of some inherited tubulopathies
Disorder [OMIM number]	Protein defect	Chromosome localization	Inheritance	Clinical features/notes	Biochemical features
Proximal tubule					
Lowe's syndrome (oculocerebral dystrophy [309000]	OCRL1	Xq26.1	XR	Hydrophthalmia, cataract, mental retardation, hyporeflexia, hypotonia and progressive kidney failure, normotensive	Plasma: ↓K, ↓CO_{2}; urine: ↑LMWP, ↑AA, ↑PO_{4}, ↑K
Wilson's disease [277900]	ATP7B	13q14.3-q21.1	AR	Liver disease or neurologic symptoms, or both, Kayser–Fleischer rings, normotensive	Plasma: ↑free copper, abnormal LFTs; urine: ↑copper excretion, ↑LMWP, ↑AA, ↑PO_{4}, ↑glycosuria
Dent's disease (X-linked recessive hypophophatemic rickets)[300009]	CLCN5	Xp11.22	XR	Nephrocalcinosis, nephrolithiasis, rachitic and osteomalacic bone disease, progressive kidney failure, normotensive	Plasma: ↓PO_{4}, N/↓K; urine: ↑LMWP, ↑AA, ↑K, ↑Ca, ↑PO_{4}, ↑glycosuria
X-linked dominant hypophosphatemic rickets [307800	PHEX	Xp22.2-p22.1	XD	Growth retardation, rachitic and osteomalacic bone disease, hypophosphatemia, and renal defects in phosphate reabsorption and vitamin D metabolism	Plasma: ↓PO_{4}, ↑ALP; urine: ↑PO_{4}
Loop of Henle					
Bartter's syndrome	NKCC2 (type 1)	15q15-21.1	AR	Polyuria, polydipsia, muscle weakness, hypovolemia, normotensive or hypotensive (all types). Maternal polyhydramnios, premature birth, perinatal salt wasting, nephrocalcinosis and kidney stones (type 1 and 2), milder phenotype with normocalciuria(type 3), sensorineural deafness, motor retardation, renal failure (type 4)	Plasma: ↑renin, ↓K, ↑CO_{2}, mild ↓Mg in some patients; urine: ↑Ca
[601678]	ROMK (type 2)	11q24	AR	Polyuria, polydipsia, muscle weakness, hypovolemia, normotensive or hypotensive (all types). Maternal polyhydramnios, premature birth, perinatal salt wasting, nephrocalcinosis and kidney stones (type 1 and 2), milder phenotype with normocalciuria(type 3), sensorineural deafness, motor retardation, renal failure (type 4)	
[241200]	C1C-Kb (type 3, classic)	1p36	AR	Polyuria, polydipsia, muscle weakness, hypovolemia, normotensive or hypotensive (all types). Maternal polyhydramnios, premature birth, perinatal salt wasting, nephrocalcinosis and kidney stones (type 1 and 2), milder phenotype with normocalciuria(type 3), sensorineural deafness, motor retardation, renal failure (type 4)	
[607364]		1p31	AR	Polyuria, polydipsia, muscle weakness, hypovolemia, normotensive or hypotensive (all types). Maternal polyhydramnios, premature birth, perinatal salt wasting, nephrocalcinosis and kidney stones (type 1 and 2), milder phenotype with normocalciuria(type 3), sensorineural deafness, motor retardation, renal failure (type 4)	
[602522]	Barttin (type 4)			Polyuria, polydipsia, muscle weakness, hypovolemia, normotensive or hypotensive (all types). Maternal polyhydramnios, premature birth, perinatal salt wasting, nephrocalcinosis and kidney stones (type 1 and 2), milder phenotype with normocalciuria(type 3), sensorineural deafness, motor retardation, renal failure (type 4)	
Hypomagnesemic hypercalciuric nephrocalcinosis (magnesium-losing kidney) [248250]	PCLN1	3q27	AR	Nephrocalcinosis, renal failure, ocular/hearing defects, polyruria, polydipsia, recurrent urinary tract infections, recurrent renal colic, normotensive	Plasma: ↓Mg, ↑PTH; urine: ↑Ca, ↑Mg
Distal tubule/collecting duct					
Liddle's syndrome [177200]	ENaC (activating)	16p13-p12	AD	Early, and frequently severe, hypertension, stroke	Plasma: ↓renin, ↓K, ↓Mg, ↑CO_{2}; urine: ↑K
Pseudohypoaldosteronism type 1a [264350]	ENaC (inactivating)	12p13, 16p13-p12	AR	Presents in infancy with salt-wasting and hypotension, cough, respiratory infections	Plasma: ↑renin, ↓Na, ↑K, ↓CO_{2}; urine: ↑K
Pseudohypoaldosteronism type 1b [177735]	Mineralocorticoid receptor	4q31.1	AD	Presents in infancy with salt-wasting and hypotension. Milder than type 1a and remits with age	Plasma: ↑renin, ↓Na, ↑K, ↓CO_{2}; urine: ↑K
Pseudohypoaldosteronism type 2 (Gordon's syndrome) [145260]	Unknown (?WNK)	1q31-q42, 12p13, 17q21-q22	AD	Hypertension (± muscle weakness, short stature, intellectual impairment). Correction of physiologic abnormalities by thiazide diuretics	Plasma: ↓renin, ↑K, ↓CO_{2}, ↑Cl; urine: ↓K
Gitelman's syndrome [263800]	NCCT	16q13	AR	Hypotension, weakness, paresthesias, tetany, fatigue, and salt craving, presentation generally much later in life than in Bartter's and hypocalciuria is typical	Plasma: ↑renin, ↓K, ↓Mg, ↑CO_{2}; urine: ↓calcium:creatinine excretion ratio (useful in distinguishing Gitelman's and Bartter's) (Note: biochemically can mimic thiazide use)
X-linked nephrogenic diabetes insipidus type 1 [304800]	V2 receptor	Xq28	XR	Hyperthermia, polyuria, polydipsia, dehydration, inability to form concentrated urine, intellectual disability if diagnosis delayed. Symptoms in infancy	Hyperosmolar plasma, dilute urine
Autosomal dominant nephrogenic diabetes insipidus type 2 [192340]	AQP2	12q13	AD and AR	Polyuria, polydipsia, dehydration, inability to form concentrated urine. Symptoms after first year of life	Hyperosmolar plasma, dilute urine

AA: aminoaciduria; AD: autosomal dominant; AR: autosomal recessive; LFTs: liver function tests; LMWP: low molecular weight proteinuria; XD: X-linked dominant; XR: X-linked recessive; PTH: parathyroid hormone
