= Hypochloremia =

Abnormally low levels of chloride in the blood

- Chlorine
- Specialty: Endocrinology
- Complications: Metabolic alkalosis
- Causes: Vomiting, Diuretics
- Treatment: Treat underlying cause, salt and fluid intake

Hypochloremia (or hypochloraemia) is an electrolyte disturbance in which there is an abnormally low level of the chloride ion in the blood. Normal serum range for chloride is 97 to 107 mmol/L with levels less than 96 mmol/L defining hypochloremia.

Hypochloremia can contribute to metabolic alkalosis. Patients with mild hypochloremia may be asymptomatic. In significant chloride depletion and the resulting alkalosis, symptoms may include neuromuscular irritability, such as muscle cramps, twitching, and, in severe cases, seizures.

Treatment involves diagnosing the underlying cause. Mild hypochloremia may be corrected by salt intake. For more severe hypochloremia, IV fluids may be given.

It rarely occurs in the absence of other abnormalities. It is sometimes associated with hypoventilation. It can be associated with chronic respiratory acidosis. If it occurs together with metabolic alkalosis (decreased blood acidity) it is often due to vomiting. It is usually the result of hyponatremia or elevated bicarbonate concentration. It occurs in cystic fibrosis.

== Causes ==
=== Gastrointestinal causes ===
- Gastric fluid loss – loss of hydrochloric acid from the stomach due to severe vomiting or nasogastric suction tube.
- Congenital chloride diarrhea – rare autosomal recessive disease characterized by persistent, lifelong, watery diarrhea with high fecal chloride concentration.

=== Renal causes ===
- Diuretic therapy – Thiazide diuretics and loop diuretics like furosemide inhibit chloride reabsorption causing hypochloremia and metabolic alkalosis. Thiazides block NCC and furosemide blocks NKCC2.
- Chronic respiratory acidosis – Compensatory reabsorption of bicarbonate in exchange for chloride.
- Bartter syndrome – Chloride wasting due to defective NKCC2 Symptoms similar to loop diuretic therapy like furosemide.
- Gitelman syndrome – Chloride wasting due to defective NCC. Symptoms similar to thiazide diuretic therapy.

=== Other causes ===
- Cystic fibrosis – Loss of chloride through excessive sweating due to defective chloride transport.
- Excessive bicarbonate administration – Can dilute serum chloride and shift acid-base balance.
