= Hypokalemia =

Insufficient potassium in the blood

- Other names: Hypokalaemia, hypopotassaemia, hypopotassemia
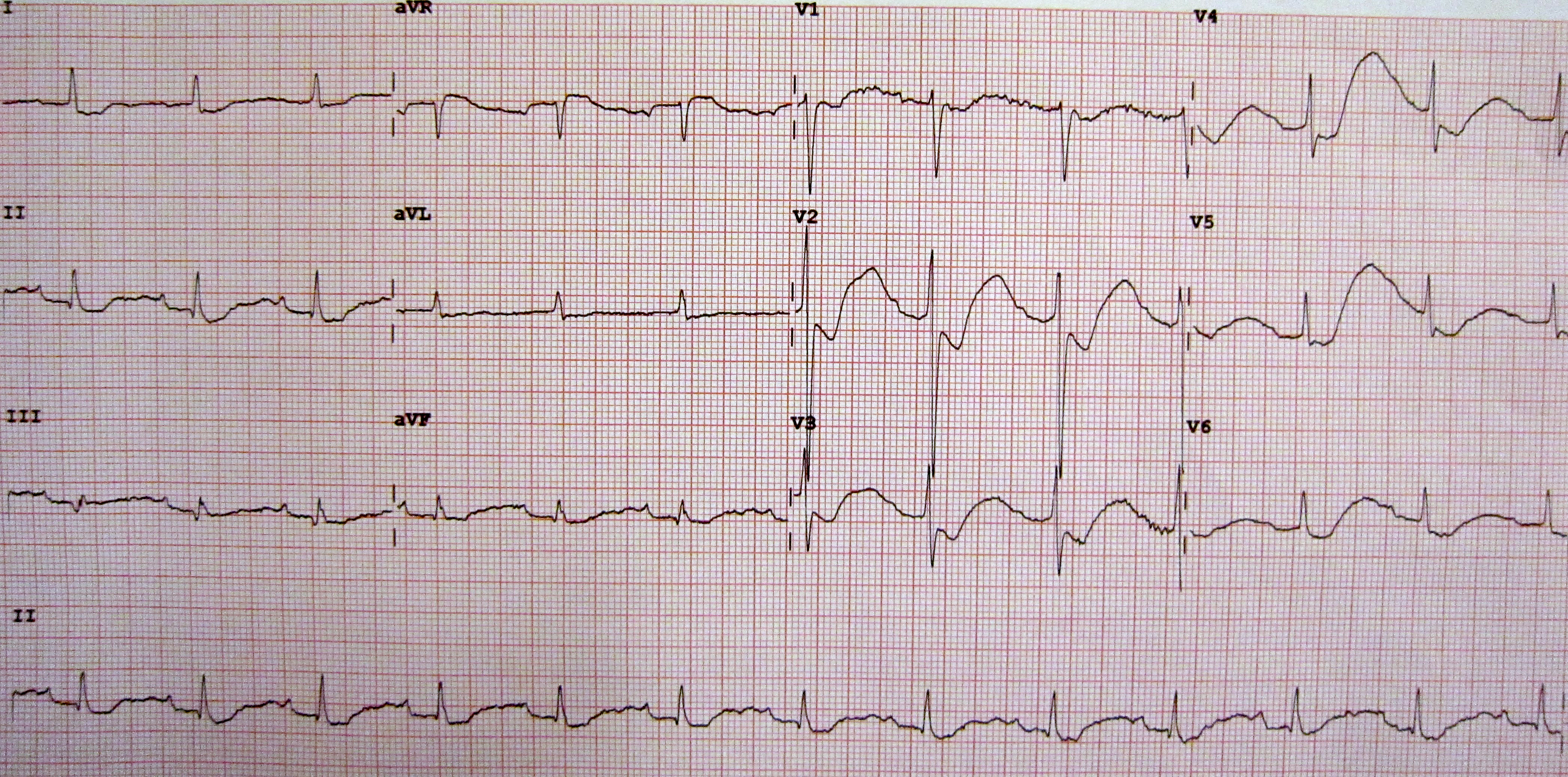
- An ECG in a person with a potassium level of 1.0 meq/L showing the classical changes of ST segment depression, inverted T waves, large U waves, and a slightly prolonged PR interval.
- Specialty: Critical care medicine
- Symptoms: Feeling tired, leg cramps, weakness, constipation, Heart arrhythmia|abnormal heart rhythm]] Irritability shallow breathing dyspnea delirium proteinuria polyuria polydipsia Depression
- Complications: Cardiac arrest Asystole TDP (Torsades de Pointes) Rhabdomyolysis Death
- Causes: Diarrhea, medications like furosemide and steroids, dialysis, diabetes insipidus, hyperaldosteronism, hypomagnesemia, not enough intake in the diet vomiting
- Risk factors: Vomiting Diarrhea Diuretics Kidney Disease Steroids (corticosteroids) not enough intake in diet
- Diagnostic method: Blood tests
- Differential diagnosis: Hyperaldosteronism Hypomagnesemia
- Prevention: intravenous potassium (KCl) and intravenous magnesium if it doesn't resolve
- Treatment: Dietary changes, potassium supplements, based on the underlying cause
- Medication: Potassium Supplements
- Frequency: 20% of people admitted to hospital

Hypokalemia is a low level of potassium (K^{+}) in the blood serum. Mild low potassium does not typically cause symptoms. Symptoms may include feeling tired, leg cramps, weakness, and constipation. Low potassium also increases the risk of an abnormal heart rhythm, which is often too slow and can cause cardiac arrest.

Causes of hypokalemia include vomiting, diarrhea, medications like furosemide and steroids, dialysis, diabetes insipidus, hyperaldosteronism, hypomagnesemia, and not enough intake in the diet. Normal potassium levels in humans are between 3.5 and 5.0 mmol/L (3.5 and 5.0 mEq/L) with levels below 3.5 mmol/L defined as hypokalemia. It is classified as severe when levels are less than 2.5 mmol/L. Low levels may also be suspected based on an electrocardiogram (ECG). The opposite state is called hyperkalemia, which means a high level of potassium in the blood serum.

The speed at which potassium should be replaced depends on whether or not there are symptoms or abnormalities on an electrocardiogram. Potassium levels that are only slightly below the normal range can be managed with changes in the diet. Lower levels of potassium require replacement with supplements either taken by mouth or given intravenously. If given intravenously, potassium is generally replaced at rates of less than 20 mmol/hour. Solutions containing high concentrations of potassium (>40 mmol/L) should generally be given using a central venous catheter. Magnesium replacement may also be required.

Hypokalemia is one of the most common water–electrolyte imbalances. It affects about 20% of people admitted to the hospital. The word hypokalemia comes from hypo- 'under' + kalium 'potassium' + -emia 'blood condition'.

== Signs and symptoms ==
Mild hypokalemia is often without symptoms. Acute potassium depletion through severe dietary restriction leads to hypokalemia and elevation of blood pressure. Severe hypokalemia, with serum potassium concentrations of 2.5–3 meq/L (Nl: 3.5–5.0 meq/L), may cause muscle weakness, myalgia, tremor, and muscle cramps (owing to disturbed function of skeletal muscle), and constipation (from disturbed function of smooth muscle). With more severe hypokalemia, flaccid paralysis and hyporeflexia may result. Reports exist of rhabdomyolysis occurring with profound hypokalemia with serum potassium levels less than 2 meq/L. Respiratory depression from severe impairment of skeletal muscle function is found in some people. Psychological symptoms associated with severe hypokalemia can include delirium, hallucinations, depression, or psychosis.

== Causes ==
Hypokalemia can result from one or more of these medical conditions:

=== Inadequate potassium intake ===
Not eating a diet with enough potassium-containing foods or fasting can cause the gradual onset of hypokalemia. This is a rare cause and may occur in those with anorexia nervosa or those on a ketogenic diet. In a short-term study, severely low potassium intake (10 meq/day) led to mild hypokalemia at 9 days (mean serum potassium 3.2 meq/L).

=== Gastrointestinal or skin loss ===
A more common cause is excessive loss of potassium, often associated with significant fluid losses that cause potassium to be flushed out of the body. Typically, this is a consequence of diarrhea, excessive perspiration, losses associated with crush injury, or surgical procedures. Vomiting can also cause hypokalemia, although relatively little potassium is lost in the vomitus. Rather, heavy urinary losses of K^{+} in the setting of post-emetic bicarbonaturia force urinary potassium excretion. (See discussion of alkalosis below.) Other gastrointestinal causes include pancreatic fistulae and the presence of adenoma.

=== Urinary loss ===
- Certain medications can cause excess potassium loss in the urine. Blood pressure medications such as loop diuretics (e.g. furosemide) and thiazide diuretics (e.g., hydrochlorothiazide) commonly cause hypokalemia. Other medications, such as the antifungal amphotericin B or the cancer drug cisplatin, can also cause long-term hypokalemia. Diuretic abuse among athletes and people with eating disorders may present with hypokalemia due to urinary potassium loss.
- A special case of potassium loss occurs with diabetic ketoacidosis. Hypokalemia is observed with low total body potassium and a low intracellular concentration of potassium. In addition to urinary losses from polyuria and volume contraction, also an obligate loss of potassium from kidney tubules occurs as a cationic partner to the negatively charged ketone, β-hydroxybutyrate.
- A low level of magnesium in the blood can also cause hypokalemia. Magnesium is required for adequate processing of potassium. This may become evident when hypokalemia persists despite potassium supplementation. Other electrolyte abnormalities may also be present.

- An increase in the pH of the blood (alkalosis) can cause temporary hypokalemia by causing a shift of potassium out of the plasma and interstitial fluids into the urine via several interrelated mechanisms.
  1) Type B intercalated cells in the collecting duct reabsorb H^{+} and secrete HCO_{3}, while in type A intercalated cells protons are secreted via both H^{+}-K^{+}ATPases and H^{+} ATP-ases on the apical/luminal surface of the cell. By definition, the H^{+}-K^{+}ATPase reabsorbs one potassium ion into the cell for every proton it secretes into the lumen of the collecting duct of a nephron. In addition, when H^{+} is expelled from the cell (by H^{+}ATP-ase), cations—in this case potassium—are taken up by the cell to maintain electroneutrality (but not through direct exchange as with the H^{+}-K^{+}ATPase). To correct the pH during alkalosis, these cells will use these mechanisms to reabsorb great amounts of H^{+}, which will concomitantly increase their intracellular concentrations of potassium. This concentration gradient drives potassium to be secreted across the apical surface of the cell into the tubular lumen through potassium channels (this facilitated diffusion occurs in both Type B intercalated cells and Principal cells in the collecting duct).
  2) Metabolic alkalosis is often present in states of volume depletion, such as vomiting, so potassium is also lost via aldosterone-mediated mechanisms.
  3) During metabolic alkalosis, the acute rise of plasma HCO_{3}^{−} concentration (caused by vomiting, for example) will exceed the capacity of the renal proximal tubule to reabsorb this anion, and potassium will be excreted as an obligate cation partner to the bicarbonate.
- Disease states that lead to abnormally high aldosterone levels can cause hypertension and excessive urinary losses of potassium. These include renal artery stenosis and tumors (generally nonmalignant) of the adrenal glands, e.g., Conn's syndrome (primary hyperaldosteronism). Cushing's syndrome can also lead to hypokalemia due to excess cortisol binding the Na^{+}/K^{+} pump and acting like aldosterone. Hypertension and hypokalemia can also be seen with a deficiency of the 11-beta-hydroxysteroid dehydrogenase type 2 enzyme, which allows cortisols to stimulate aldosterone receptors. This deficiency—known as apparent mineralocorticoid excess syndrome—can either be congenital or caused by consumption of glycyrrhizin, which is contained in extract of licorice, sometimes found in herbal supplements, candies, and chewing tobacco.
- Rare hereditary defects of renal salt transporters, such as Bartter syndrome or Gitelman syndrome, can cause hypokalemia, like that of diuretics. As opposed to disease states of primary excesses of aldosterone, blood pressure is either normal or low in Bartter's or Gitelman's.

=== Distribution away from extracellular fluid ===
- In addition to alkalosis, other factors can cause transient shifting of potassium into cells, presumably by stimulation of the Na^{+}/K^{+} pump. These hormones and medications include insulin, epinephrine, and other beta agonists (e.g. salbutamol or salmeterol), and xanthines (e.g. theophylline). Stimulants (amphetamines, methylphenidate, cocaine) can also cause hypokalemia by stimulating beta-2 receptors.
- Rare hereditary defects of muscular ion channels and transporters that cause hypokalemic periodic paralysis can precipitate occasional attacks of severe hypokalemia and muscle weakness. These defects cause a heightened sensitivity to the normal changes in potassium produced by catecholamines and/or insulin and/or thyroid hormone, which lead to movement of potassium from the extracellular fluid into the muscle cells.

=== Other ===
- A handful of published reports describe individuals with severe hypokalemia related to chronic extreme consumption (4–10 L/day) of cola. The hypokalemia is thought to be from the combination of the diuretic effect of caffeine and copious fluid intake, although it may also be related to diarrhea caused by heavy fructose ingestion.

=== Pseudohypokalemia ===
- Pseudohypokalemia is a decrease in the amount of potassium that occurs due to excessive uptake of potassium by metabolically active cells in a blood sample after it has been drawn. It is a laboratory artifact that may occur when blood samples remain in warm conditions for several hours before processing, and occasionally in the presence of a very high count of white blood cells (hyperleukocytosis).

== Pathophysiology ==
About 98% of the body's potassium is found inside cells, with the remainder in the extracellular fluid, including the blood. This concentration gradient is maintained principally by the Na^{+}/K^{+} pump.

Potassium is essential for many body functions, including muscle and nerve activity. The electrochemical gradient of potassium between the intracellular and extracellular space is essential for nerve function; in particular, potassium is needed to repolarize the cell membrane to a resting state after an action potential has passed. Lower potassium levels in the extracellular space cause hyperpolarization of the resting membrane potential. This hyperpolarization is caused by the effect of the altered potassium gradient on resting membrane potential as defined by the Goldman equation. As a result, a greater-than-normal stimulus is required for depolarization of the membrane to initiate an action potential.

In the heart, hypokalemia causes arrhythmias because of less-than-complete recovery from sodium-channel inactivation, making the triggering of an action potential less likely. In addition, the reduced extracellular potassium (paradoxically) inhibits the activity of the I_{Kr} potassium current and delays ventricular repolarization. This delayed repolarization may promote reentrant arrhythmias.

== Diagnosis ==
=== Blood ===
Normal potassium levels are between 3.5 and 5.0 mmol/L with levels below 3.5 mmol/L (less than 3.5 mEq/L) defined as hypokalemia.

=== Electrocardiogram ===
Hypokalemia leads to characteristic ECG changes (PR prolongation, ST-segment and T-wave depression, U-wave formation).

The earliest ECG findings associated with hypokalemia are decreased T wave height. Then, ST depressions and T inversions appear as serum potassium levels reduce further. Due to prolonged repolarization of ventricular Purkinje fibers, prominent U waves occur (usually seen at V2 and V3 leads), frequently superimposed upon T waves, therefore producing the appearance of prolonged QT intervals, when serum potassium levels fall below 3 mEq/L.

=== Amount ===
The amount of potassium deficit can be calculated using the following formula:
K_{deficit} (in mmol) = (K_{normal lower limit} − K_{measured}) × body weight (kg) × 0.4
Meanwhile, the daily body requirement of potassium is calculated by multiplying 1 mmol to body weight in kilograms. Adding the potassium deficit and daily potassium requirement would give the total amount of potassium needed to be corrected in mmol. Dividing mmol by 13.4 will give the potassium in grams.

== Treatment ==
Treatment includes addressing the cause, such as improving the diet, treating diarrhea, or stopping an offending medication. People without a significant source of potassium loss and who show no symptoms of hypokalemia may not require treatment. Acutely, repletion with 10 mEq of potassium is typically expected to raise serum potassium by 0.1 mEq/L immediately after administration. However, for those with chronic hypokalemia, repletion takes time due to tissue redistribution. For example, correction by 1 mEq/L can take more than 1000 mEq of potassium over many days.

=== Oral potassium supplementation ===
Mild hypokalemia (>3.0 mEq/L) may be treated by eating potassium-containing foods or by taking potassium chloride supplements in a tablet or syrup form (by mouth supplements). Foods rich in potassium include dried fruits (particularly apricots, prunes and figs), nuts, bran cereals and wheat germ, lima beans, soy beans, molasses, leafy green vegetables, broccoli, winter squash, beets, carrots, cauliflower, potatoes, avocados, tomatoes, coconut water, citrus fruits (particularly oranges), cantaloupe, kiwis, mangoes, bananas, and red meats.

Eating potassium-rich foods may not be sufficient for correcting low potassium; potassium supplements may be recommended. Potassium contained in foods is almost entirely coupled with phosphate and is thus ineffective in correcting hypokalemia associated with hypochloremia that may occur due to vomiting, diuretic therapy, or nasogastric drainage. Additionally, replacing potassium solely through diet may be costly and result in weight gain due to potentially large amounts of food needed. An effort should also be made to limit dietary sodium intake due to an inverse relationship with serum potassium. Increasing magnesium intake may also be beneficial for similar physiological reasons.

Potassium chloride supplements by mouth have the advantage of containing precise quantities of potassium, but the disadvantages of a taste which may be unpleasant, and the potential for side-effects including nausea and abdominal discomfort. Potassium bicarbonate is preferred when correcting hypokalemia associated with metabolic acidosis.

=== Intravenous potassium replacement ===
Severe hypokalemia (<3.0 mEq/L) may require intravenous supplementation. Typically, a saline solution is used, with 20–40 meq/L KCl per liter over 3–4 hours. Giving IV potassium at faster rates (20–25 meq/hr) may inadvertently expose the heart to a sudden increase in potassium, potentially causing dangerous abnormal heart rhythms such as heart block or asystole. Faster infusion rates are therefore generally only performed in locations in which the heart rhythm can be continuously monitored such as a critical care unit. When replacing potassium intravenously, particularly when higher concentrations of potassium are used, infusion by a central line is encouraged to avoid the occurrence of a burning sensation at the site of infusion, or the rare occurrence of damage to the vein. When peripheral infusions are necessary, the burning can be reduced by diluting the potassium in larger amounts of fluid, or adding a small dose of lidocaine to the intravenous fluid, although adding lidocaine may increase the likelihood of medical errors. Even in severe hypokalemia, oral supplementation is preferred given its safety profile. Sustained-release formulations should be avoided in acute settings.

=== Potassium-sparing diuretics ===
Hypokalemia, which is recurrent or resistant to treatment, may be amenable to a potassium-sparing diuretic, such as amiloride, triamterene, spironolactone, or eplerenone. Concomitant hypomagnesemia will inhibit potassium replacement, as magnesium is a cofactor for potassium uptake.

== Popular culture ==
The plot of the science fiction novel Destiny's Road by Larry Niven centers around the setting's scarcity of available potassium, and the resulting deficiency and its effects on the world's colonists and their society.

== See also ==
- Bartter syndrome
- Gitelman syndrome
- Hypokalemic acidosis
- Potassium deficiency (plant disorder)
- Superior mesenteric artery syndrome
