= Gitelman syndrome =

Genetic kidney disorder

- Other names: Primary renal tubular hypokalemic hypomagnesemia with hypocalciuria
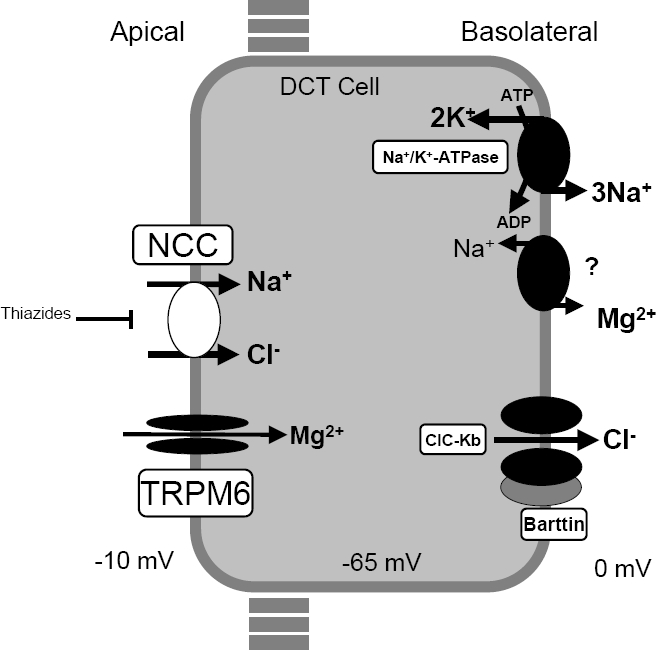
- A model of transport mechanisms in the distal convoluted tubule. Sodium chloride (NaCl) enters the cell via the apical thiazide-sensitive NCC and leaves the cell through the basolateral Cl^{−} channel (ClC-Kb), and the Na^{+}/K^{+}-ATPase. Indicated also are the recently identified magnesium channel TRPM6 in the apical membrane, and a putative Na/Mg exchanger in the basolateral membrane. These transport mechanisms play a role in familial hypokalemia-hypomagnesemia or Gitelman syndrome.
- Specialty: Nephrology
- Causes: Mutations in SLC12A3, CLCNKB, MT-TI, MT-TF
- Frequency: 0.005%

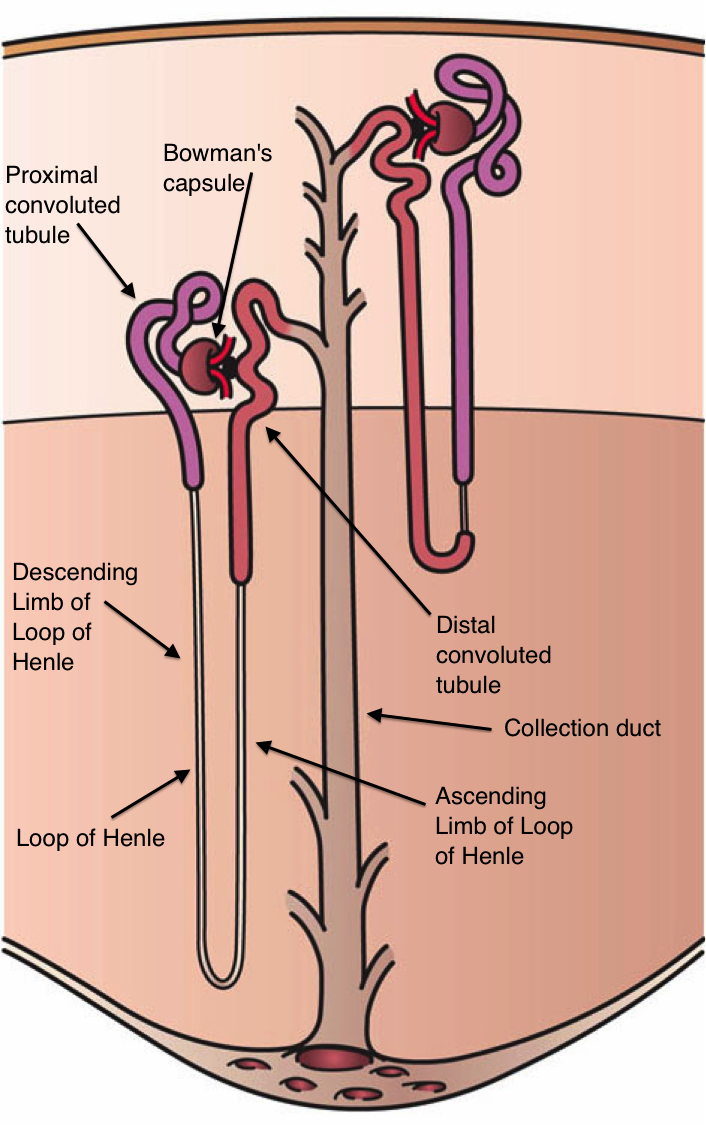
Anatomy of a Nephron; functional unit of the kidney

Gitelman syndrome (GS) is an autosomal recessive kidney tubule disorder characterized by low blood levels of potassium and magnesium, decreased excretion of calcium in the urine, and elevated blood pH. It is the most frequent hereditary salt-losing tubulopathy. Gitelman syndrome is caused by disease-causing variants on both alleles of the SLC12A3 gene. The SLC12A3 gene encodes the thiazide-sensitive sodium-chloride cotransporter (also known as NCC, NCCT, or TSC), which can be found in the distal convoluted tubule of the kidney.

Disease-causing variants in SLC12A3 lead to a loss of NCC function, i.e., reduced transport of sodium and chloride via NCC. The effect is an electrolyte imbalance similar to that seen with thiazide diuretic therapy (which causes pharmacological inhibition of NCC activity).

Gitelman syndrome was formerly considered a subset of Bartter syndrome until the distinct genetic and molecular bases of these disorders were identified.

== Signs and symptoms ==
Affected individuals may not have symptoms in some cases. Symptomatic individuals present with symptoms almost identical to those of patients who are on thiazide diuretics, given that the affected transporter is the target of thiazides.

Clinical signs of Gitelman syndrome include a high blood pH in combination with low levels of chloride, potassium, and magnesium in the blood and decreased calcium excretion in the urine. In contrast to people with Gordon's syndrome, those affected by Gitelman syndrome generally have low or normal blood pressure. Individuals affected by Gitelman syndrome often complain of severe muscle cramps or weakness, numbness, thirst, waking up at night to urinate, salt cravings, abnormal sensations, chondrocalcinosis, or weakness expressed as extreme fatigue or irritability. Though cravings for salt are most common and severe, cravings for sour foods (e.g. vinegar, lemons, and sour figs) have been noted in some persons affected. More severe symptoms such as seizures, tetany, and paralysis have been reported. Abnormal heart rhythms and a prolonged QT interval can be detected on electrocardiogram and cases of sudden cardiac death have been reported due to low potassium levels. Quality of life is decreased in Gitelman syndrome.

Phenotypic variations observed among patients probably result from differences in their genetic background and may depend on which particular amino acid in the NCCT protein has been mutated. A study by Riviera-Munoz et al. identified a subset of individuals with Gitelman syndrome with a severe phenotypic expression. The clinical manifestations observed in this group were neuromuscular manifestations, growth retardation, and ventricular arrhythmias. The patients were mostly male and were found to have at least one allele of a splice defect on the SLC12A3 gene.

== Cause ==
Gitelman syndrome has an autosomal recessive pattern of inheritance.

Gitelman syndrome is caused by disease-causing variants on both alleles of the SLC12A3 gene, which encodes NCC, the sodium-chloride cotransporter. The sodium-chloride cotransporter is a protein made up of 1021 amino acids and 12 transmembrane domains. A large number of disease-causing variants throughout the SLC12A3 gene have been reported, including missense, nonsense, frame-shift, splice-site and intronic variants. In 2012, more than 180 mutations of this transporter protein had already been described.

The sodium-chloride cotransporter is a protein located in the cell membrane. It participates in the control of ion homeostasis at the distal convoluted tubule of the nephron. Thus, loss of NCC function reduces sodium and chloride reabsorption in the distal convoluted tubule. This can lead to a lower blood pressure in these patients.

Loss of NCC function has several other effects. Loss of SLC12A3 has been shown to lead to a shorter distal convoluted tubule, at least in mice. Therefore, other functions of the distal convoluted tubule might be perturbed as well. This is one of the possible reasons that magnesium reabsorption is reduced in patients, often leading to a low level of magnesium in the blood.

Secondly, processes in the distal convoluted tubule itself are altered as well. For instance, transcellular calcium reabsorption is increased. This has been suggested to be the result of a putative basolateral Na^{+}/Ca^{2+} exchanger and apical calcium channel. Furthermore, continued action of the basolateral Na^{+}/K^{+}-ATPase might create an electrical gradient favourable for the reabsorption of divalent cations by secondary active transport. This is another mechanism that might be responsible for decreased magnesium reabsorption.

Another effect of the inactivated sodium-chloride cotransporter is the subsequent activation of the renin-angiotensin aldosterone system (RAAS). RAAS activation is a byproduct of the failure of the distal convoluted tubule in reabsorbing electrolytes, specifically sodium and chloride leading to cellular dehydration. RAAS attempts to compensate for this dehydration resulting in low serum blood potassium.

Some patients have symptoms that fit with a diagnosis of Gitelman syndrome, while a genetic defect in the SLC12A3 gene cannot be found. In these cases, a different genetic defect can sometimes be identified, although some cases remain idiopathic.

== Diagnosis ==
Diagnosis of Gitelman syndrome can be confirmed after eliminating other common pathological sources of hypokalemia and metabolic alkalosis. A complete metabolic panel (CMP) or basic metabolic panel (BMP) can be used to evaluate serum electrolyte levels. Electrolyte measurement and aldosterone levels can be done via urine. The pathognomonic clinical markers include low serum levels of potassium, sodium, chloride, and magnesium in the blood as a result of urinary excretion. Urinary fractional excretion potassium is high or inappropriately normal in the context of hypokalaemia, and high levels of urinary sodium and chloride are observed. Other clinical indicators include elevated serum renin and aldosterone in the bloodstream, and metabolic alkalosis. The symptomatic features of this syndrome are highly variable ranging from asymptomatic to mild manifestations (weakness, cramps) to severe symptoms (tetany, paralysis, rhabdomyolysis). Symptom severity is multi-factorial, with phenotypic expression varying amongst individuals within the same family. Genetic testing is another measure of identifying the underlying mutations which cause the pathologic symptoms of the disease. This mode of testing is available at select laboratories.

When only one pathogenic variant is found with regular diagnostics, screening of SLC12A3 introns can be considered.

Work-up to exclude the differential diagnosis of the electrolyte abnormalities is key.

=== Differential diagnosis ===
Many diseases (both genetic and non-genetic) can give symptoms which are very similar to Gitelman syndrome. The following are some examples, as well as examples of how they can differ from classic Gitelman syndrome.

- In Gitelman syndrome hypocalciuria is present, and a urine calcium:creatinine ratio may help distinguish it from Bartter syndrome as the two disorders can be clinically indistinguishable. Secondly, hypomagnesemia is present in most patients with Gitelman syndrome, while it is present in only some patients with Bartter syndrome. Lastly, in Bartter syndrome maximal urine concentrating ability is lost.
- Laxative abuse can mimic the serum electrolyte abnormalities, but fractional excretion of potassium will be low
- Diuretic abuse could be suspected if urinary chloride excretion varies by time of day but may require a diuretic assay to detect
- Surreptitious vomiting can cause metabolic alkalosis and hypokalaemia, but urinary chloride levels will be low
- Medication history; Proton-pump inhibitors can cause an isolated hypomagnesaemia phenotype, and aminoglycosides such as gentamicin can cause a transient metabolic alkalosis with hypokalaemia and hypomagnesaemia that resolves 2–6 weeks after drug termination.
- Primary aldosteronism will cause metabolic alkalosis and hypokalaemia, but hypertension will be present and serum renin will be low
- EAST syndrome, though neurological features will predominate
- Renal cysts and diabetes syndrome can cause hypomagnesaemia and hypocalcuria, but is distinguished by early onset chronic kidney disease and an autosomal dominant inheritance pattern of renal cysts and/or diabetes
- A small percentage of Gitelman syndrome cases can be attributed to disease-causing variants in the CLCNKB gene. Disease-causing variants in this gene are responsible for Bartter syndrome type 3, which can present with electrolyte abnormalities that are clinically indistinguishable to Gitelman syndrome. When mutations are not found within the SLC12A3 gene, genetic screening of this gene is recommended to rule out involvement of CLCNKB gene.
- Variants in the mitochondrial transfer RNAs encoding the tRNA for isoleucine (MT-TI) and the tRNA for phenylalanine (MT-TF) in the mitochondrial DNA can also cause a Gitelman-like syndrome. These homoplasmic mitochondrial DNA mutations are maternally inherited.

== Treatment ==
To treat the symptoms related to the electrolyte abnormalities, supplementation is often needed. Dietary modification of a high salt diet incorporated with potassium and magnesium supplementation to normalize blood levels is the mainstay of treatment. Large doses of potassium and magnesium are often necessary to adequately replace the electrolytes lost in the urine. Diarrhea is a common side effect of oral magnesium which can make replacement by mouth difficult but dividing the dose to 3-4 times a day is better tolerated. Severe deficits of potassium and magnesium require intravenous replacement. Aldosterone antagonists (such as spironolactone or eplerenone) or epithelial sodium channel blockers such as amiloride have also been suggested as possible treatments, because they decrease urinary wasting of potassium. However, a consensus expert statement from 2017 warns that such drugs should only be used with caution in Gitelman syndrome because of the possible side effects (e.g., aggravated sodium depletion).

Most asymptomatic individuals with Gitelman syndrome can be monitored without medical treatment.

In patients with early onset of the disease such as infants and children, indomethacin is the drug of choice utilized to treat growth disturbances. Indomethacin in a study by Blanchard et al. 2015 was shown to increase serum potassium levels, and decrease renin concentration. Adverse effects of indomethacin include a decrease in the glomerular filtration rate, and gastrointestinal disturbances. Therefore, these drugs should also be used only with caution in Gitelman syndrome.

Cardiac evaluation is promoted in the prevention of dysrhythmias and monitoring of QT interval activity. Medications that extend or prolong the QT interval (macrolides, antihistamines, beta-2 agonists) should be avoided in these patients to prevent cardiac death.

== Epidemiology ==
Estimates of the prevalence of Gitelman syndrome range from 1 in 80,000 to 1 in 500 people, depending on the population. The ratio of men to women affected is 1:1. This disease is encountered typically after the 1st decade of life, i.e., during adolescence or adulthood. However, it can occur in the neonatal period. Heterozygous carriers of the SLC12A3 gene mutations are 1% of the population. A person with Gitelman syndrome has a low probability of passing the disease to their offspring. This chance is roughly 1 in 400, unless both genetic parents are carriers of disease-causing alleles.

== History ==
The condition is named for Hillel Jonathan Gitelman (1932– January 12, 2015), an American nephrologist working at University of North Carolina School of Medicine. He first described the condition in 1966, after observing a pair of sisters with the disorder. Gitelman and his colleagues later identified and isolated the gene responsible (SLC12A3) by molecular cloning.
