= TRPM6 =

Protein-coding gene in the species Homo sapiens

Identifiers
- Aliases: TRPM6, CHAK2, HMGX, HOMG, HOMG1, HSH, transient receptor potential cation channel subfamily M member 6
- External IDs: OMIM: 607009; MGI: 2675603; GeneCards: TRPM6
Enzyme activity
| EC # | BRENDA | ExPASy | KEGG | MetaCyc |
|---|---|---|---|---|
| 2.7.11.1 | ↗ | ↗ | ↗ | ↗ |

Gene location (Human)
| Chr. | Chromosome 9 (human) |
| Band | 9q21.13 | Start | 74,722,495 bp |
| Band | 9q21.13 | End | 74,888,094 bp |

Gene location (Mouse)
| Chr. | Chromosome 19 (mouse) |
| Band | 19|19 B | Start | 18,727,347 bp |
| Band | 19|19 B | End | 18,869,875 bp |
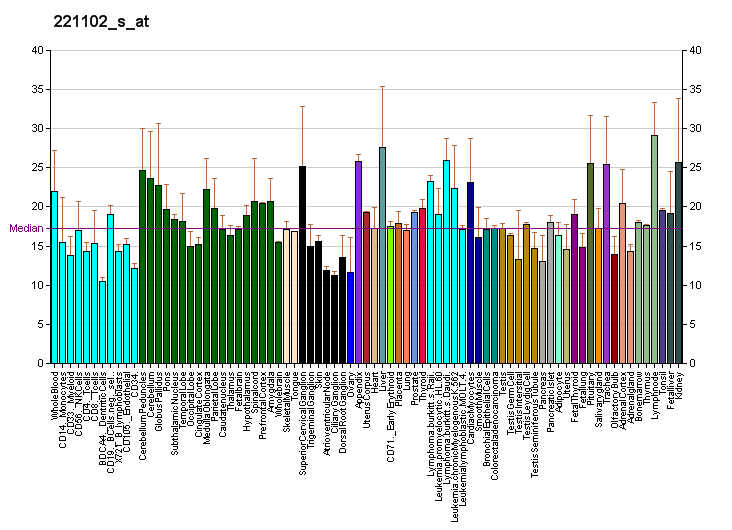
RNA expression pattern
| Bgee | Human / Mouse (ortholog); Top expressed in: mucosa of colon; mucosa of sigmoid colon; jejunal mucosa; rectum; mucosa of transverse colon; hair follicle; duodenum; testicle; gonad; gingival epithelium / Top expressed in: conjunctival fornix; left colon; spermatid; right lung lobe; seminiferous tubule; zygote; right kidney; oocyte; secondary oocyte; Paneth cell; More reference expression data |
| BioGPS | More reference expression data |
Gene ontology
| Molecular function | transferase activity; nucleotide binding; metal ion binding; kinase activity; protein serine/threonine kinase activity; ion channel activity; protein binding; cation channel activity; ATP binding; calcium channel activity |
| Cellular component | integral component of membrane; membrane; plasma membrane; brush border membrane; apical plasma membrane |
| Biological process | phosphorylation; metal ion transport; cation transport; ion transport; protein tetramerization; protein phosphorylation; calcium ion transmembrane transport; response to toxic substance; calcium ion transport; transmembrane transport |
Sources:Amigo / QuickGO
Orthologs
| Databases | NCBI: entry; OMA: entry |
| Species | Human | Mouse |
| Entrez | 140803 | 225997 |
| Ensembl | ENSG00000119121 | ENSMUSG00000024727 |
| UniProt | Q9BX84 | Q8CIR4 |
| RefSeq (mRNA) | NM_001177310; NM_001177311; NM_017662 | NM_153417 |
| RefSeq (protein) | NP_001170781; NP_001170782; NP_060132 | NP_700466 |
| Location (UCSC) | Chr 9: 74.72 – 74.89 Mb | Chr 19: 18.73 – 18.87 Mb |
| PubMed search |
- Wikidata
| View/Edit Human | View/Edit Mouse |

TRPM6 is a transient receptor potential ion channel associated with hypomagnesemia with secondary hypocalcemia.

== See also ==
- TRPM
- Ruthenium red
