= CLCNKB =

Protein-coding gene in humans

Identifiers
- Aliases: CLCNKB, CLCKB, ClC-K2, ClC-Kb, chloride voltage-gated channel Kb
- External IDs: OMIM: 602023; MGI: 1329026; GeneCards: CLCNKB

Gene location (Human)
Chr.	Chromosome 1 (human)
Band	1p36.13	Start	16,040,252 bp
Band	1p36.13	End	16,057,311 bp

Gene location (Mouse)
Chr.	Chromosome 4 (mouse)
Band	4|4 D3	Start	141,111,921 bp
Band	4|4 D3	End	141,126,035 bp
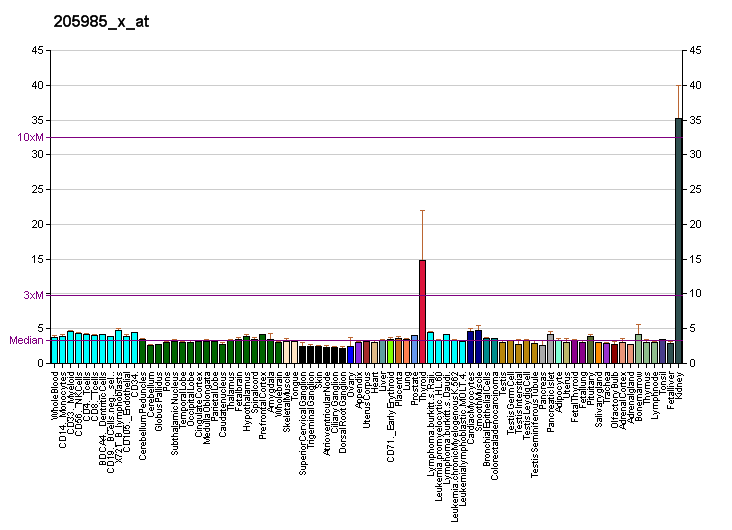
RNA expression pattern
Bgee	Human / Mouse (ortholog); Top expressed in: renal medulla; parotid gland; sperm; right lobe of thyroid gland; left lobe of thyroid gland; human kidney; apex of heart; oocyte; cerebellar hemisphere; right hemisphere of cerebellum / Top expressed in: right kidney; distal tubule; outer renal medulla; human kidney; connecting tubule; Ascending limb of loop of Henle; stria vascularis; inner renal medulla; inner stripe of outer renal medulla; saccule; More reference expression data
BioGPS	More reference expression data
Gene ontology
Molecular function	metal ion binding; voltage-gated ion channel activity; chloride channel activity; voltage-gated chloride channel activity
Cellular component	integral component of membrane; plasma membrane; integral component of plasma membrane; chloride channel complex; membrane
Biological process	ion transmembrane transport; chloride transport; excretion; regulation of ion transmembrane transport; ion transport; transmembrane transport; chloride transmembrane transport
Sources:Amigo / QuickGO
Orthologs
Databases	NCBI: entry; OMA: entry
Species	Human	Mouse
Entrez	1188	12733
Ensembl	ENSG00000184908	ENSMUSG00000033770
UniProt	P51801	Q9WUB7
RefSeq (mRNA)	NM_000085; NM_001165945	NM_001146307; NM_024412
RefSeq (protein)	NP_000076; NP_001159417	NP_001139779; NP_077723
Location (UCSC)	Chr 1: 16.04 – 16.06 Mb	Chr 4: 141.11 – 141.13 Mb
PubMed search
- Wikidata
View/Edit Human	View/Edit Mouse

Chloride channel Kb, also known as CLCNKB, is a protein which in humans is encoded by the CLCNKB gene.

Chloride channel Kb (CLCNKB) is a member of the CLC family of voltage-gated chloride channels, which comprises at least 9 mammalian chloride channels. Each is believed to have 12 transmembrane domains and intracellular N and C termini. Mutations in CLCNKB result in the autosomal recessive Type III Bartter syndrome. CLCNKA and CLCNKB are closely related (94% sequence identity), tightly linked (separated by 11 kb of genomic sequence) and are both expressed in mammalian kidney.

== See also ==
- Chloride channel
- BSND, barttin, accessory subunit beta for this channel
