= Metal transporter CNNM3 =

Protein, forming human gene

CNNM3

Identifiers
- Aliases: CNNM3, ACDP3, cyclin and CBS domain divalent metal cation transport mediator 3
- External IDs: OMIM: 607804; MGI: 2151055; GeneCards: CNNM3

Gene location (Human)
Chr.	Chromosome 2 (human)
Band	2q11.2	Start	96,816,245 bp
Band	2q11.2	End	96,835,382 bp

Gene location (Mouse)
Chr.	Chromosome 1 (mouse)
Band	1 B|1 15.3 cM	Start	36,550,948 bp
Band	1 B|1 15.3 cM	End	36,567,318 bp
RNA expression pattern
Bgee	Human / Mouse (ortholog); Top expressed in: gastrocnemius muscle; right hemisphere of cerebellum; right uterine tube; muscle of thigh; ventricular zone; cardia; pylorus; body of pancreas; sural nerve; left ovary / Top expressed in: aortic valve; ascending aorta; epiblast; cerebellar cortex; cumulus cell; pineal gland; granulocyte; muscle of thigh; ventricular zone; visual cortex; More reference expression data
BioGPS	n/a
Gene ontology
Molecular function	protein binding; transmembrane transporter activity
Cellular component	integral component of membrane; plasma membrane; membrane
Biological process	ion transport; transport; transmembrane transport
Sources:Amigo / QuickGO
Orthologs
Databases	NCBI: entry; OMA: entry
Species	Human	Mouse
Entrez	26505	94218
Ensembl	ENSG00000168763	ENSMUSG00000001138
UniProt	Q8NE01	Q32NY4
RefSeq (mRNA)	NM_017623; NM_199078	NM_001039551; NM_053186; NM_001331209
RefSeq (protein)	NP_060093; NP_951060	NP_001034640; NP_001318138; NP_444416
Location (UCSC)	Chr 2: 96.82 – 96.84 Mb	Chr 1: 36.55 – 36.57 Mb
PubMed search
- Wikidata
View/Edit Human	View/Edit Mouse

Metal transporter CNNM3 is a protein which in humans is encoded by the gene CNNM3. It is a transmembrane protein which is thought to help mediate the transport of magnesium ions. It is made up of 707 amino acids. Although CNNM3 is ubiquitous, it is mostly present in the kidney, brain, lung, spleen, heart and liver.

When was discovered, CNNM3 protein was called cyclin M3 because of the similarity on its sequence with the cyclin family. However, it belongs to CNNMs transmembrane family, together with CNNM1, CNNM2 and CNNM4. The main function of CNNM3, along with the other CNNM proteins, is to regulate Mg2+ levels in the cell and maintain its homeostasis.

== Structure ==
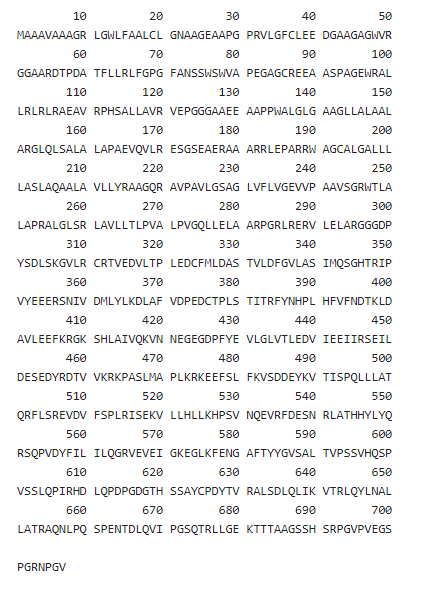
Metal transporter CNNM3 primary structure

Regarding the structure, CNNMs contain an N-terminal extracellular domain, a transmembrane domain called DUF21, a large cytosolic region that includes a pair of cystathionine-β-synthase domains, known as CBS-pair, and, furthermore, a putative cyclic nucleotide-binding homology domain, which name is CNBH (Cyclic Nucleotide-Binding Homology). The CBS-pair domain has been extensively characterized, yet little is known about the CNBH domain.

In spite of the fact that active member domains can occur as dimers and monomers, the inactive member, CNNM3, can only as a dimer. It exists an inverse correlation between the propensity of the CNBH domains to dimerize and the ability of CNNMs to mediate Mg^{2+} efflux, which has been proved with analytical ultracentrifugation experiments.

=== Cbs-pair domains ===
The CBS-pair domains dimerize and are a place of regulation through ATP-Mg^{2+} binding. Nucleotide binding leads to a change of the dimer conformation: from a twisted to a flat disc-like structure. This allows the efflux of Mg^{2+} between the extracellular matrix and the cytosolic matrix.

CBS-1 is located between 318th and 379th aminoacid while CBS-2 is between the 386th and 452th. The CBS-2 domain is the site where the PRL-2 binds CNNM3.

=== CNBH domain ===
While CBS-pair domains have been widely characterized, studies do not report too much information about CNBH domain. CNBH sequence is similar than the sequence of other cyclic nucleotide-binding domains. The CNBH domain of CNNM3 is different from the CNBH domain of the rest of the proteins in its family due to the exception of a large variable loop. The domain CNBH does not interact with either CBS-pair domains or PRL proteins, but it can be involved in a process of dimerization, which has the function of inhibit and regulate the activity of CNNM3.

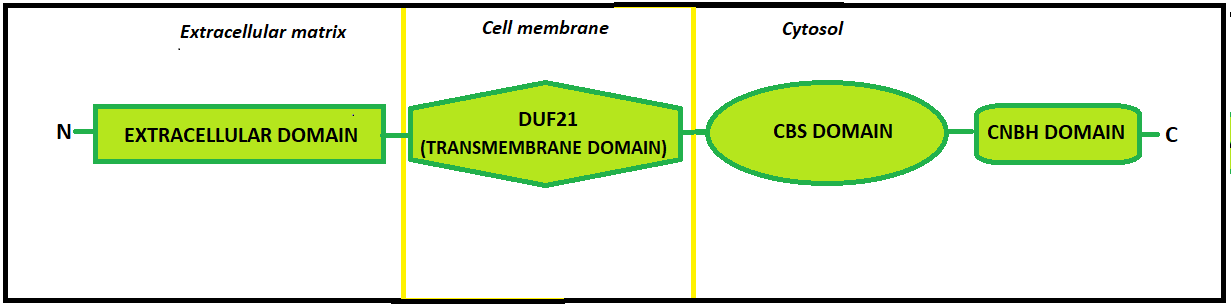
CNNM3 protein scheme

One mutation on this domain has been connected to Jalili syndrome.

=== Transmembrane domain ===
The transmembrane domain, called DUF21, is the one that crosses the cellular membrane. The hydrophobic side of this domain, interacts with the lipid bilayer and the hydrophilic side is where magnesium ions cross.

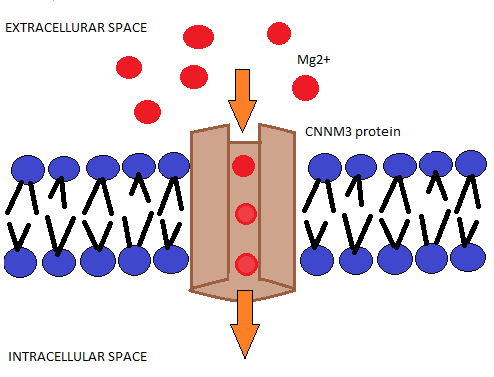
Representation of active transport of Mg2+ through CNNM3

== Function ==
Magnesium (Mg^{2+}) is one of the most abundants cations inside cells and it is essential for an extensive variety of biochemical processes that occur in our organisms: energy metabolism, maintenance of the stability of DNA, synthesis of proteins, and over six hundred enzymatic reactions. Mg^{2+} is special among divalent cations in the fact that it has the smallest ionic radius and largest hydrated radius; consequently, the transport of Mg^{2+} across the membrane involves the action of Mg^{2+} channels and transporters, among which CNNM3 proteins play a very important role.

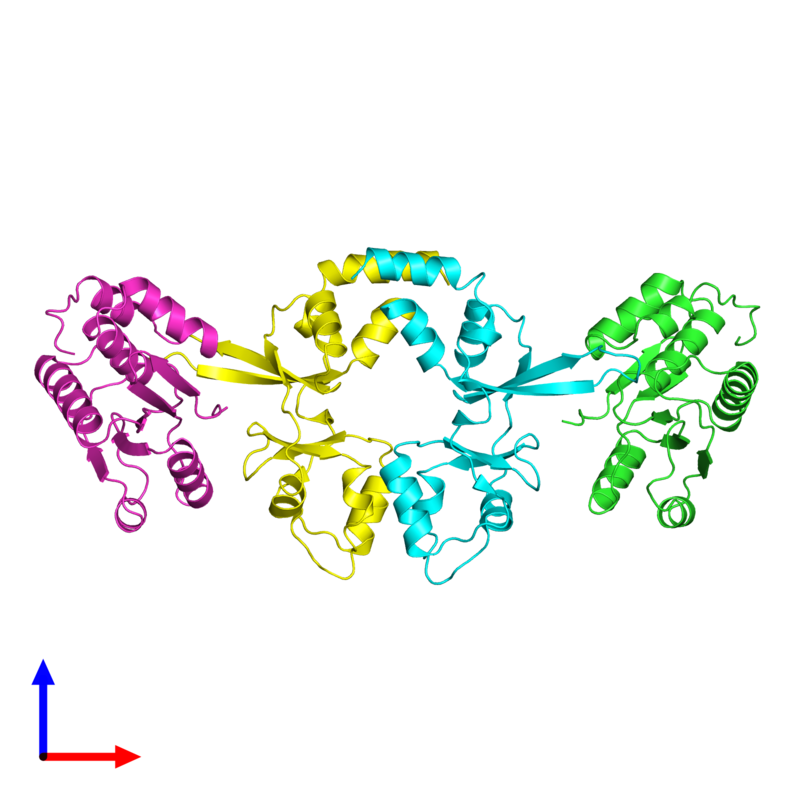
Crystal structure of PRL-3 phosphatase in complex with the Bateman domain of CNNM3 magnesium transporter

== Clinical significance ==
=== PRL-2/CNNM3 complex ===
PRLs (mainly PRL-2), important in the metastasis of several human cancers whose molecular base of operation remains confusing, control the intracellular levels of magnesium forming a complex with a set of amino acid residing in the Bateman module (CBS- pair domain) on the CNNM3 magnesium transporter. When this union takes place intracellular Mg2+ levels rise promoting an uncontrolled cellular proliferation, this justifies why PRL-2 overexpression is thought to promote growth of the tumor. Interactions between CBS-pair domain of CNNM3 and either PRL 2 or PRL 3 are known thanks to the usage of X-ray crystallography, isothermal titration calorimetry, and activity assays.

Researchers have shown that amino acid 426 (Asp) of CNNM3 binds in the catalytic site of PRL-2. They proved it with 426th aminoacid mutated CNNM3, which was not able to join to PRL-2.

Overall, PRL-2 controls tumor growth by CNNM3. Nevertheless, this has only been proved in breast cancer as is the only that has been under this kind of investigation. Starting from an orthotopic xenotransplant breast cancer model, the in vivo importance of the point mutation D426A (in the position 426, there is a change of an aspartic acid to an alanine) that completely alters the formation of the CNNM3-PRL 2 complex is confirmed.

Overexpression of this CNNM3 binding mutant in cancer cells decreases the proliferation capacity in situations of magnesium shortage and in conditions independent of anchorage growth.

Thanks to the use of molecular modeling it was possible to observe how the Asp-426 side chain in CNNM3 is embedded in the catalytic cavity of PRL 2. Therefore, using a PRL inhibitor it would be possible to disable the formation of complexes, resulting in a decreased cell proliferation in these types of human cancer. These evidences could be opening a path towards new innovative therapeutic routes and of wide application.

To recap, the oncogenic PRL-2 is responsible for regulating tumor growth, setting intracellular levels of magnesium by joining with the CNNM3 magnesium transporter.

=== Regulation in lung adenocarcinoma ===
Lung cancer is one of the most common malignant tumours and a leading cause of mortality in humans. Lung cancer is the most common cause of cancer-related death among men and the second most common cancer-related death among women worldwide. Nowadays, current treatments against lung cancer involve major remove surgery, followed by radio and chemotherapy. However, the survival for patients with this disease is really poor. The most important reason for this fact is that this carcer can become resistant to Cisplatin, which is an important chemotherapy medication that disrupts the structure and function of DNA.

Some studies have revealed that the expression of Pyrubate dehydrogenase kinase (PDK), which is an enzymatic regulator in some metabolic processes as glycolysis and oxidative phosphorilation, is increased in some tumors in colon or lung cancer. PDK2, has been identified as the most important encoding gene for the Cistaplin resistance in lung adenocarcinoma. The expression of this gene is dramatically elevated in high-grade lung adenocarcinoma and could be conversely correlated to the poor prognosis.

Moreover, it has been prove that CNNM3 is one of the most correlated genes to PDK2 in lung adenocarcinoma. PDK2 regulates the activity of the CNNM3 promoter in lung adenocarcinoma and this cell signalling pathway was essential for tumour proliferation and Cisplatin-resistance in lung adenocarcinoma cells, indicating that PDK2/CNNM3 signalling pathway may be a potential therapeutic target for Cisplatin-resistant lung adenocarcinoma.

However, it is still unknown if there are other transcription factors involving all this process.
