= Hypocalciuria =

Lack of calcium in the urine

Hypocalciuria is a low level of calcium in the urine. It is a significant risk factor for predicting eclampsia in pregnancy. The most common causes for hypocalciuria is either thiazide diuretics or reduced dietary intake of calcium. The other cause is Familial hypocalciuric hypercalcemia (FHH). Low dietary sodium causes hypocalciuria. It is also common in patients with Gitelman syndrome.
