= Chromophobe renal cell carcinoma =

Type of kidney cancer

Chromophobe renal cell carcinoma (chRCC) is a rare type of kidney cancer, making up about 5–7% of all adult kidney tumors. It develops from cells in the distal tubules of the kidney and has unique features under the microscope and at the genetic level, such as frequent loss of certain chromosomes and changes in genes like TP53 and PTEN. Most chRCC cases are found at an early stage and tend to grow slowly, so patients usually have a good outlook. However, a small number of cases can be more aggressive, especially if the tumor shows sarcomatoid features or necrosis. Because chRCC is uncommon, there are few treatments designed specifically for it, so doctors often use the same therapies as for more common types of kidney cancer, even though chRCC may respond differently].

== See also ==
- Papillary renal cell carcinoma and other cancer of the kidneys
