= Familial hypocalciuric hypercalcemia =

Genetic disorder causing excess calcium in blood

- Specialty: Endocrinology, medical genetics

Familial hypocalciuric hypercalcemia (FHH) is an inherited condition that can cause hypercalcemia, a serum calcium level typically above 10.2 mg/dL; although uncommon. It is also known as familial benign hypocalciuric hypercalcemia (FBHH) where there is usually a family history of hypercalcemia which is mild, a urine calcium to creatinine ratio <0.01, and urine calcium <200 mg/day (hypocalciuria).

== Signs and symptoms ==
Most cases of familial hypocalciuric hypercalcemia are asymptomatic. Laboratory signs of FHH include:

- High blood levels of calcium (hypercalcemia)
- A low amount of calcium excreted in the urine (Ca excretion rate < 0.02 mmol/L)
- High blood levels of magnesium (hypermagnesemia)
- High normal to mildly elevated parathyroid hormone

== Causes ==
Types include:

Name	OMIM	Locus	Gene
HHC1	145980	3q13.3-q21	CaSR
HHC2	145981	19p13.3	?
HHC3	600740	19q13	?

== Pathogenesis ==
Most cases of FHH are associated with loss of function mutations in the calcium-sensing receptor (CaSR) gene, expressed in parathyroid and kidney tissue. These mutations decrease the receptor's sensitivity to calcium, resulting in reduced receptor stimulation at normal serum calcium levels. As a result, inhibition of parathyroid hormone release does not occur until higher serum calcium levels are attained, creating a new equilibrium. This is the opposite of what happens with the CaSR sensitizer, cinacalcet. Functionally, parathyroid hormone (PTH) increases calcium resorption from the bone and increases phosphate excretion from the kidney which increases serum calcium and decreases serum phosphate. Individuals with FHH, however, typically have normal PTH levels, as normal calcium homeostasis is maintained, albeit at a higher equilibrium set point. As a consequence, these individuals are not at increased risk of the complications of hyperparathyroidism.

Another form has been associated with chromosome 3q.

=== Functions of the calcium-sensing receptor ===
- Parathyroid gland: mediates negative feedback mechanisms relating to PTH secretion. In normal individuals, PTH secretion decreases with increasing blood calcium levels. Loss of function abnormalities in the CaSR here cause hypercalcemia.
- Kidneys: mediates negative feedback mechanisms relating to calcium reabsorption from the tubular system. In normal individuals, reabsorption of calcium and other electrolytes decreases with increasing blood calcium level. Loss of function abnormalities in the CaSR here contribute to both hypercalcemia and hypocalciuria.

== Diagnosis ==
As most cases of FHH are asymptomatic and benign, the diagnosis of FHH is less likely to be made. Typically, diagnosis is made in the pursuit of uncovering the etiology of hypercalcemia. Calcium levels are often in the high normal range or slightly elevated. Commonly, the parathyroid hormone level is checked and may be slightly elevated or also on the high normal end. Normally, high calcium should cause low PTH and so this level of PTH is inappropriately high due to the decreased sensitivity of the parathyroid to calcium. This may be mistaken for primary hyperparathyroidism. However, evaluation of urine [serum?] calcium level will reveal a low level of urine calcium. This too is inappropriate as high serum calcium should result in high urine calcium. If urine calcium is not checked, this may lead to parathyroidectomy for presumed primary hyperparathyroidism

Additionally as the name implies, there may be a family history of benign hypercalcemia.

Ultimately, diagnosis of familial hypocalciuric hypercalcemia is made—as the name implies—by the combination of low urine calcium and high serum calcium.

== Treatment ==
No treatment is generally required, as bone demineralisation and kidney stones are relatively uncommon in the condition.
