= MT-TF =

Transfer RNA

mitochondrially encoded tRNA phenylalanine

Identifiers
- Symbol: MT-TF
- Alt. symbols: MTTF
- NCBI gene: 4558
- HGNC: 7481
- RefSeq: NC_001807

Other data
- Locus: Chr. MT

Mitochondrially encoded tRNA phenylalanine also known as MT-TF is a transfer RNA which in humans is encoded by the mitochondrial MT-TF gene.

== Structure ==
The MT-TF gene is located on the p arm of the mitochondrial DNA at position 12 and it spans 71 base pairs. The structure of a tRNA molecule is a distinctive folded structure which contains three hairpin loops and resembles a three-leafed clover.

== Function ==
MT-TF is a small transfer RNA (human mitochondrial map position 577-647) that transfers the amino acid phenylalanine to a growing polypeptide chain at the ribosome site of protein synthesis during translation.

== Clinical significance ==
Mutations in MT-TF can result in mitochondrial deficiencies and associated disorders, including Myoclonic epilepsy with ragged-red fibers (MERRF), Mitochondrial encephalomyopathy, lactic acidosis, and stroke-like episodes (MELAS), Juvenile myopathy, encephalopathy, lactic acidosis, and stroke.

=== Myoclonic epilepsy with ragged-red fibers (MERRF) ===
Mutations in the MT-TF gene have been associated with myoclonic epilepsy with ragged-red fibers (MERRF). Myoclonic epilepsy with ragged-red fibers (MERRF) is a disorder that affects many parts of the body, particularly the muscles and nervous system. In most cases, the signs and symptoms of this disorder appear during childhood or adolescence. The features of MERRF vary widely among affected individuals, even among members of the same family. Common symptoms include:

- myoclonus
- myopathy
- spasticity
- epilepsy
- peripheral neuropathy
- dementia
- ataxia
- atrophy

A 611G-A transition in MT-TF was found in a patient with MERRF.

=== Mitochondrial encephalomyopathy, lactic acidosis, and stroke-like episodes (MELAS) ===
Mitochondrial encephalomyopathy, lactic acidosis, and stroke-like episodes (MELAS) is a condition that affects many of the body's systems, particularly the brain and nervous system (encephalo-) and muscles (myopathy). The signs and symptoms of this disorder most often appear in childhood following a period of normal development, although they can begin at any age. Early symptoms may include muscle weakness and pain, recurrent headaches, loss of appetite, vomiting, and seizures. Most affected individuals experience stroke-like episodes beginning before age 40. These episodes often involve temporary muscle weakness on one side of the body (hemiparesis), altered consciousness, vision abnormalities, seizures, and severe headaches resembling migraines. Repeated stroke-like episodes can progressively damage the brain, leading to vision loss, problems with movement, and a loss of intellectual function (dementia).

A patient with a mutation in the 583G-A position of the MT-TF gene exhibited symptoms of acute episodes of headaches, photophobia, vomiting, and a fully recovered left arm focal motor fitting.

=== Complex IV Deficiency ===
MT-TF mutations have been associated with complex IV deficiency of the mitochondrial respiratory chain, also known as the cytochrome c oxidase deficiency. Cytochrome c oxidase deficiency is a rare genetic condition that can affect multiple parts of the body, including skeletal muscles, the heart, the brain, or the liver. Common clinical manifestations include myopathy, hypotonia, and encephalomyopathy, lactic acidosis, and hypertrophic cardiomyopathy. 622G>A mutations have been associated with the deficiency.
