= MT-TI =

Transfer RNA

mitochondrially encoded tRNA isoleucine

Identifiers
- Symbol: MT-TI
- Alt. symbols: MTTI
- NCBI gene: 4565
- HGNC: 7488
- RefSeq: NC_001807

Other data
- Locus: Chr. MT

Mitochondrially encoded tRNA isoleucine also known as MT-TI is a transfer RNA which in humans is encoded by the mitochondrial MT-TI gene.

== Structure ==
The MT-TI gene is located on the p arm of the mitochondrial DNA at position 12 and it spans 69 base pairs. The structure of a tRNA molecule is a distinctive folded structure which contains three hairpin loops and resembles a three-leafed clover.

== Function ==
MT-TI is a small 69 nucleotide RNA (human mitochondrial map position 4263-4331) that transfers the amino acid isoleucine to a growing polypeptide chain at the ribosome site of protein synthesis during translation.

== Clinical significance ==
Mutations in MT-TI can result in multiple mitochondrial deficiencies and associated disorders.

=== Myoclonic epilepsy with ragged-red fibers (MERRF) ===
Mutations in the MT-TI gene have been associated with myoclonic epilepsy with ragged-red fibers (MERRF). Myoclonic epilepsy with ragged-red fibers (MERRF) is a disorder that affects many parts of the body, particularly the muscles and nervous system. In most cases, the signs and symptoms of this disorder appear during childhood or adolescence. The features of MERRF vary widely among affected individuals, even among members of the same family. Common symptoms include, myoclonus, myopathy, spasticity, epilepsy, peripheral neuropathy, dementia, ataxia, atrophy, and more.

=== Cardiomyopathy ===
Mutations in the MT-TI gene may also cause cardiomyopathy, a disorder of the heart characterized by the thickening of the heart, usually in the interventricular septum, which results in a weakened heart muscle that is unable to pump blood effectively. It is unclear why such mutations result in the symptoms of isolated cardiomyopathy. Mutations of 4300A>G, 4295A>G, 4269A>G, and 4317A>G in the MT-TI gene have been found in patients with cardiomyopathy in varying severities and onset.

=== Complex IV Deficiency ===
MT-TI mutations have been associated with complex IV deficiency of the mitochondrial respiratory chain, also known as the cytochrome c oxidase deficiency. Cytochrome c oxidase deficiency is a rare genetic condition that can affect multiple parts of the body, including skeletal muscles, the heart, the brain, or the liver. Common clinical manifestations include myopathy, hypotonia, and encephalomyopathy, lactic acidosis, and hypertrophic cardiomyopathy. A patient with a 4269A>G mutation in MT-TI was found with the deficiency.
