= KCNJ1 =

Protein-coding gene in humans

Identifiers
- Aliases: KCNJ1, KIR1.1, ROMK, ROMK1, potassium voltage-gated channel subfamily J member 1, potassium inwardly rectifying channel subfamily J member 1
- External IDs: OMIM: 600359; MGI: 1927248; GeneCards: KCNJ1

Gene location (Human)
| Chr. | Chromosome 11 (human) |
| Band | 11q24.3 | Start | 128,836,315 bp |
| Band | 11q24.3 | End | 128,867,373 bp |

Gene location (Mouse)
| Chr. | Chromosome 9 (mouse) |
| Band | 9|9 A4 | Start | 32,283,789 bp |
| Band | 9|9 A4 | End | 32,310,493 bp |
RNA expression pattern
| Bgee | Human / Mouse (ortholog); Top expressed in: renal medulla; kidney tubule; glomerulus; metanephric glomerulus; human kidney; testicle; nucleus accumbens; epithelium of colon; putamen; tail of epididymis / Top expressed in: right kidney; human kidney; inner renal medulla; distal tubule; inner stripe of outer renal medulla; olfactory epithelium; connecting tubule; outer stripe of outer renal medulla; convoluted tubule; cortical collecting duct; More reference expression data |
| BioGPS | n/a |
Gene ontology
| Molecular function | nucleotide binding; voltage-gated ion channel activity; phosphatidylinositol-4,5-bisphosphate binding; inward rectifier potassium channel activity; ATP binding; ATP-activated inward rectifier potassium channel activity |
| Cellular component | integral component of membrane; membrane; voltage-gated potassium channel complex; plasma membrane |
| Biological process | excretion; regulation of ion transmembrane transport; ion transport; potassium ion transport; potassium ion import across plasma membrane |
Sources:Amigo / QuickGO
Orthologs
| Databases | NCBI: entry; OMA: entry |
| Species | Human | Mouse |
| Entrez | 3758 | 56379 |
| Ensembl | ENSG00000151704 | ENSMUSG00000041248 |
| UniProt | P48048 | O88335 |
| RefSeq (mRNA) | NM_153767; NM_000220; NM_153764; NM_153765; NM_153766 | NM_001168354; NM_019659 |
| RefSeq (protein) | NP_000211; NP_722448; NP_722449; NP_722450; NP_722451 | NP_001161826; NP_062633 |
| Location (UCSC) | Chr 11: 128.84 – 128.87 Mb | Chr 9: 32.28 – 32.31 Mb |
| PubMed search |
- Wikidata
| View/Edit Human | View/Edit Mouse |

The renal outer medullary potassium channel (ROMK) is an ATP-dependent potassium channel (K_{ir}1.1) that in humans is encoded by the KCNJ1 gene. It plays an important role in potassium recycling in the thick ascending limb (TAL) and potassium secretion in the cortical collecting duct (CCD) of the nephron. Multiple transcript variants encoding different isoforms have been found for this gene.

== Function ==
Potassium channels are present in most mammalian cells, where they participate in a wide range of physiologic responses. The protein encoded by this gene is an integral membrane protein and inward-rectifier type potassium channel. It is inhibited by internal ATP and probably plays an important role in potassium homeostasis. The encoded protein has a greater tendency to allow potassium to flow into a cell rather than out of a cell, which has (hence the term "inwardly rectifying" referring to corresponding currents in electrophysiology, but has limited physiological relevance). ROMK was identified as the pore-forming component of the mitochondrial ATP-sensitive potassium (mitoK_{ATP}) channel, known to play a critical role in cardioprotection against ischemic-reperfusion injury in the heart as well as in the protection against hypoxia-induced brain injury from stroke or other ischemic attacks.

Klotho is a beta-glucuronidase-like enzyme that activates ROMK by removal of sialic acid.

== Clinical significance ==
Mutations in this gene have been associated with antenatal Bartter syndrome, which is characterized by salt wasting, hypokalemic alkalosis, hypercalciuria, and low blood pressure.

== Role in hypokalemia and magnesium deficiency ==
The ROMK channels are inhibited by magnesium in the nephron's normal physiologic state. In states of hypokalemia (a state of potassium deficiency), concurrent magnesium deficiency results in a state of hypokalemia that may be more difficult to correct with potassium replacement alone. This may be directly due to decreased inhibition of the outward potassium current in states where magnesium is low. Conversely, magnesium deficiency alone is not likely to cause a state of hypokalemia. Sgk1 kinase has also been reported to phosphorylate ROMK, resulting in an increase of channels on the apical surface of the distal tubule. Sgk1 is in turn regulated by the mineralocorticoid receptor such an effect may contribute to the kaliuretic action of aldosterone.
