= BSND =

Protein-coding gene in humans

Identifiers
- Aliases: BSND, BART, DFNB73, barttin CLCNK type accessory beta subunit, barttin CLCNK type accessory subunit beta
- External IDs: OMIM: 606412; MGI: 2153465; HomoloGene: 14291; GeneCards: BSND; OMA:BSND - orthologs

Gene location (Human)
Chr.	Chromosome 1 (human)
Band	1p32.3	Start	54,998,933 bp
Band	1p32.3	End	55,017,172 bp

Gene location (Mouse)
Chr.	Chromosome 4 (mouse)
Band	4|4 C7	Start	106,340,653 bp
Band	4|4 C7	End	106,349,480 bp
RNA expression pattern
Bgee	Human / Mouse (ortholog); Top expressed in: renal medulla; human kidney; mucosa of nose; gonad; thigh; muscle of thigh; olfactory zone of nasal mucosa; mouth; blood; salivary gland / Top expressed in: right kidney; embryo; thin ascending limb of loop of Henle; outer renal medulla; human kidney; stria vascularis; inner stripe of outer renal medulla; embryo; parotid gland; vestibular sensory epithelium; More reference expression data
BioGPS	n/a
Gene ontology
Molecular function	chloride channel regulator activity; chloride channel activity; voltage-gated chloride channel activity
Cellular component	cytoplasm; integral component of membrane; plasma membrane; basolateral plasma membrane; integral component of plasma membrane; membrane; protein-containing complex
Biological process	ion transmembrane transport; chloride transport; chloride transmembrane transport
Sources:Amigo / QuickGO
Orthologs
Species	Human	Mouse
Entrez	7809	140475
Ensembl	ENSG00000162399	ENSMUSG00000025418
UniProt	Q8WZ55	Q8VIM4
RefSeq (mRNA)	NM_057176	NM_080458
RefSeq (protein)	NP_476517	NP_536706
Location (UCSC)	Chr 1: 55 – 55.02 Mb	Chr 4: 106.34 – 106.35 Mb
PubMed search
- Wikidata
View/Edit Human	View/Edit Mouse

Bartter syndrome, infantile, with sensorineural deafness (Barttin), also known as BSND, is a human gene which is associated with Bartter syndrome.

This gene encodes an essential beta subunit for CLC chloride channels. These heteromeric channels localize to basolateral membranes of renal tubules in the kidney and of potassium-secreting epithelia of the inner ear. Mutations in this gene have been associated with Bartter syndrome with sensorineural deafness.

== As a diagnostic marker ==
BSND is a key diagnostic marker in differentiating the chromophobe renal cell carcinoma (chRCC) from other types of RCC. chRCC is a type of kidney cancer that presents in the cell lining of the small tubules in the kidney. RNA-sequence data from The Cancer Genome Atlas revealed that BSND was one of three genes (alongside ATP6V1G3) with high RNA expression in chRCC. Strong, diffuse expression of BSND was observed in chRCC but not in clear cell RCC or papillary RCC. Additionally, BSND expression was found to correlate with lower DNA methylation near the transcription start site, indicating the presence of epigenetic regulation. This expression reveals BSND's potential to serve as a major immunohistochemical marker for distinguishing chRCC from other forms of RCC.

BSND immunohistochemistry is also pivotal in differentiating oncocytic and Warthin-like MECs in salivary gland neoplasms. Greater than 10% BSND positivity helps distinguish Warthin tumors from Warthin-like MECs and greater than 20% BSND positivity helps distinguish oncocytomas from oncocytic MECs.
