= Gordon syndrome =

- Other names: Camptodactyly-cleft palate-clubfoot syndrome
- Gordon syndrome is inherited in an autosomal dominant manner

Gordon Syndrome, or distal arthrogryposis type 3, is a rare genetic disorder characterized by cleft palate and congenital contractures of the hands and feet.

== Signs and symptoms ==
Gordon syndrome is a form of hypertension. On a molecular level, it is characterized by severe hyperkalemia with otherwise normal renal functioning. Hyperkalemia is excessive potassium concentration in the blood, and is often accompanied by other electrolyte imbalances, such as high amounts of chloride in blood (hypercholermia), and acidemia (acidic blood).

It is distinguished from other forms of hypertension by the severity of the hyperkalemia, which reaches 8-9 mmol/L in patients with Gordon Syndrome []. This can result in vomiting, diarrhea, and abdominal pain. In severe cases, patients present with short stature, muscle weakness, and intellectual disability.

Other signs and symptoms include short stature, bifid uvula, hip dislocation, abnormal spinal curvature such as scoliosis, lordosis, or kyphoscoliosis, or abnormal webbing of the fingers and toes called syndactyly.

== Cause ==
Gordon Syndrome is a rare autosomal dominant disorder caused by mutations in PIEZO2. This gene provides instructions to create proteins that control sensation and muscle coordination. Mutations in this gene affect mobility and musculoskeletal development.

An abnormal copy of the gene can be inherited or develop as a new mutation. As a dominant gene, only a single abnormal copy of it needs to be present to cause the disorder. Males and females are equally as likely to inherit the gene, although there is some evidence that female carriers are more likely to be asymptomatic or experience a less severe version.

== Epidemiology ==
It affects males and females equally. Fewer than 50 cases have been reported worldwide in five families, known as kindreds. In most people, physical features associated with Gordon Syndrome are obvious at birth, such as clubfoot or cleft palate. Diagnosis is conducted by genetic testing to identify mutations in the PIEZO2 gene, and x-rays may be ordered to identify abnormalities in the bone.

== History ==
It was first described in Australia in the 1960s by a doctor named Richard Gordon who tracked several Australian families with the gene. When more cases were discovered, the gene was found to have a phenotype-genotype correlation, shown by how some pedigrees of the gene experienced more severe symptoms.

== Differing diagnosis ==
Gordon Syndrome (distal arthrogryposis type 3, DA3) should not be confused with another rare genetic condition also referred to as "Gordon Syndrome" - Pseudohypoaldosteronism Type II (PHA2). While these two disorders share a name, DA3 and PHA2 are genetically distinct.

PHA2, also called familial hyperkalemic hypertension, is a renal tubular disorder characterized by hyperkalemia (elevated blood potassium), metabolic acidosis, hypertension, and typically normal kidney function. PHA2 is caused by mutations in the WNK1, WNK4, CUL3, and KLHL3 genes, which regulate sodium and potassium transport in the kidneys. This results in individuals with PHA2 exhibiting electrolyte imbalances, including high chloride levels (hyperchloremia), often without the physical or skeletal abnormalities associated with DA3.

PHA2 is often diagnosed in late childhood or adolescence, typically during evaluation for unexplained hypertension or abnormal blood test results. Diagnosis can be confirmed via blood tests and molecular genetic testing.

=== Differing prognosis and treatment ===
Prognosis for individuals with PHA2 is generally good with appropriate treatment, typically involving thiazide diuretics, managing hypertension and electrolyte imbalances, leading to most living normal lives with managed blood pressure. In contrast. DA3 may involve lifelong mobility issues, the severity of these issues varying with the severity of contractures and presence of associated features. Treatment is largely orthopedic, including physical therapy and surgical correction of joint deformities.

=== Differing classifications ===
Due to both disorders being referenced as "Gordon syndrome," an accurate diagnosis requires accurate information on presenting features, family history, age of onset, and molecular findings. Resources such as the National Organization for Rare Disorders (NORD) and the Genetic and Rare Disease Information Center (GARD) maintain separate entries for these conditions to help distinguish between PHA2 and DA3.
