= WNK =

WNK may refer to:

- Wanukaka language, the ISO 639-3 code wnk
- WNK, one of the STADAN stations
- A group of kinases called WNK
  - WNK1
  - WNK2
  - WNK3
  - WNK4
