= NCCT =

The acronym NCCT may mean:

- The National Committee for Counter Trafficking, a National Committee in Cambodia
- Non-Cooperative Countries or Territories, designated by the FATF
- "Na-Cl co-transporter", or sodium-chloride symporter
- National Center for Competency Testing, an American certification organization
- National Center for Computational Toxicology, office under United States Environmental Protection Agency
- Network-Centric Collaborative Targeting, a military collaboration program by L3 Communications
- Non-contrast computed tomography
- NISSAN Cyclic Corrosion Test
