= Gordon's syndrome =

Gordon's syndrome may refer to the following medical conditions:

- Pseudohypoaldosteronism type 2, a rare disease
- a form of arthrogryposis
