= WNK4 =

Protein-coding gene in the species Homo sapiens

Identifiers
- Aliases: WNK4, PHA2B, PRKWNK lysine deficient protein kinase 4
- External IDs: OMIM: 601844; MGI: 1917097; GeneCards: WNK4
Available structures
PDB	Ortholog search: PDBe RCSB
PDB	List of PDB id codes 2V3S, 4CH9, 4CHB
Enzyme activity
EC #	BRENDA	ExPASy	KEGG	MetaCyc
2.7.11.1	↗	↗	↗	↗

Gene location (Human)
Chr.	Chromosome 17 (human)
Band	17q21.2	Start	42,780,610 bp
Band	17q21.2	End	42,797,066 bp

Gene location (Mouse)
Chr.	Chromosome 11 (mouse)
Band	11|11 D	Start	101,151,393 bp
Band	11|11 D	End	101,168,235 bp
RNA expression pattern
Bgee	Human / Mouse (ortholog); Top expressed in: renal medulla; mucosa of transverse colon; mucosa of ileum; human kidney; rectum; pancreatic ductal cell; mucosa of sigmoid colon; tibia; testicle; stromal cell of endometrium / Top expressed in: stria vascularis; right kidney; otic vesicle; vestibular membrane of cochlear duct; human kidney; yolk sac; gastrula; renal cortex; inner renal medulla; medullary collecting duct; More reference expression data
BioGPS	n/a
Gene ontology
Molecular function	transferase activity; nucleotide binding; protein kinase activity; kinase activity; protein binding; chloride channel inhibitor activity; ATP binding; protein serine/threonine kinase activity; potassium channel inhibitor activity
Cellular component	cytoplasm; bicellular tight junction; cell junction; cytosol; membrane
Biological process	protein localization; distal tubule morphogenesis; regulation of cellular process; ion homeostasis; phosphorylation; ion transport; chloride transport; renal sodium ion absorption; negative regulation of pancreatic juice secretion; intracellular signal transduction; protein phosphorylation; negative regulation of sodium ion transport; positive regulation of ion transmembrane transporter activity; positive regulation of potassium ion import across plasma membrane; positive regulation of sodium ion transmembrane transporter activity
Sources:Amigo / QuickGO
Orthologs
Databases	NCBI: entry; OMA: entry
Species	Human	Mouse
Entrez	65266	69847
Ensembl	ENSG00000126562	ENSMUSG00000035112
UniProt	Q96J92	Q80UE6
RefSeq (mRNA)	NM_032387; NM_001321299	NM_175638
RefSeq (protein)	NP_001308228; NP_115763	NP_783569
Location (UCSC)	Chr 17: 42.78 – 42.8 Mb	Chr 11: 101.15 – 101.17 Mb
PubMed search
- Wikidata
View/Edit Human	View/Edit Mouse

Serine/threonine protein kinase WNK4 also known as With No lysine (K) protein kinase 4 (WNK4), is an enzyme that in humans is encoded by the WNK4 gene. Missense mutations cause a genetic form of pseudohypoaldosteronism type 2, also called Gordon syndrome or Familial Hyperkalemic Hypertension.

WNK4 is a member of a serine/threonine kinase family that comprises four members. The family is so named because unlike other serine/threonine kinases, WNKs are characterized by the lack of the lysine in the subdomain II of the catalytic domain. Instead, a lysine in the β2 strand of subdomain I of the catalytic domain is responsible for the kinase activity.

In humans, the WNK4 gene is located on chromosome 17q21-q22. It produces a 1,243-amino acid protein encoded by a 3,732-nucleotide open reading frame within a 4 kb cDNA transcript. WNK4 protein is highly expressed in the distal convoluted tubule (DCT) and the cortical collecting duct (CCD) of the kidney. WNK4 is also present in the brain, lungs, liver, heart, and colon of various mammalian species.

Gene mutations in WNK4 has been found in patients with pseudohypoaldosteronism type II (PHAII), also known as familial hyperkalemic hypertension (FHHt) or Gordon syndrome. PHAII is an autosomal dominant hereditary disease characterized by hyperkalemia, hypertension, and metabolic acidosis. WNK4 plays a critical role in the regulation of various ion transporters and channels in the kidney. PHAII-causing mutations in WNK4 result in the dysregulation of renal sodium and potassium transporters and channels, leading to defects in sodium and potassium retention by the kidney, and in turn, elevated blood pressure and potassium concentration in the blood (hyperkalemia).

== Structure ==
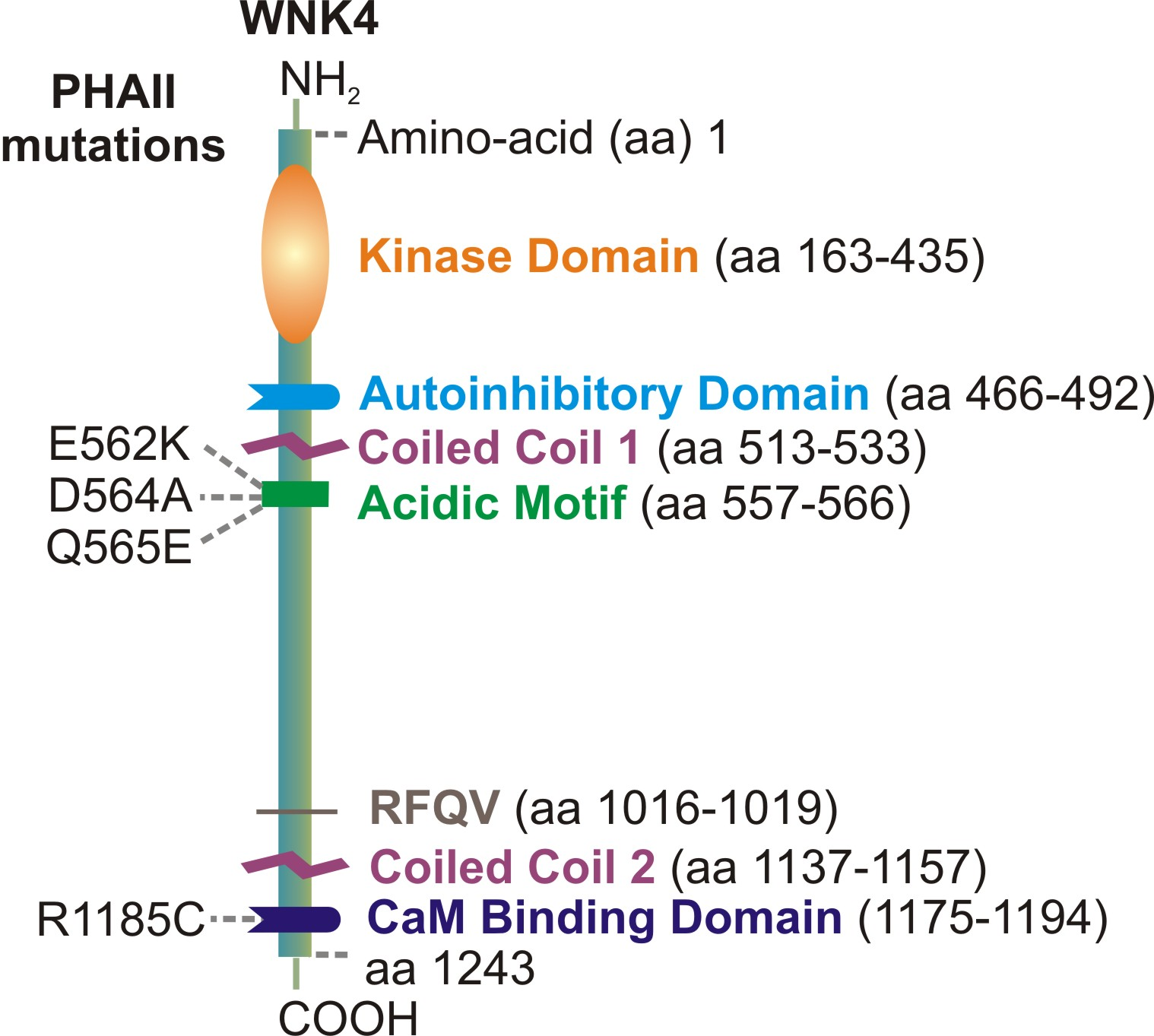
Fig. 1. Domain structure of WNK4 and the positions of the initially identified PHAII-causing mutations. The amino-acid (aa) positions of the domains are provided in parentheses. Some important PHAII mutations are localized in the acidic motif and calmodulin-binding domain, respectively.

The tertiary structure of WNK4 has not been elucidated to date. Nevertheless, several individual domain structures of the protein are identified. These include a kinase domain near the amino terminus followed by an autoinhibitory domain, an acidic motif, two coiled-coil domains, and a calmodulin-binding domain in the C-terminal segment (Fig. 1). The structures for the kinase and autoinhibitory domains of WNK1 have been revealed. The high level of structural similarity between WNK4 and WNK1 allows us to deduce key structural details of WNK4 based on the insights gained from the corresponding regions within WNK1. The kinase domain of WNK4 has an 83% sequence identity with that of WNK1. The overall fold of the kinase domain of WNK1 resembles those of other protein kinases that have a typical dual-domain architecture. The C-terminal domain of WNK4 bears a high degree of similarity to other kinases within the family. On the other hand, the N-terminal domain is unique in having a six-stranded instead of a five-stranded β sheet to form a complete β barrel. A chloride ion binding site has been identified in the region ^{320}DLG^{323} of the kinase domain in WNK4. The binding of chloride Cl^{−} in this region inhibits the activation of WNK4. The autoinhibitory domain is a homolog of the RFXV-binding PASK/FRAY homology 2 (PF2) domain. Structural studies have revealed that the autoinhibitory domain consists of three β-strands and two α-helices. Notably, the RFXV‐binding groove is formed by the β3-αA interface of WNK proteins where RFXV peptide ligand interacts directly with residues Phe524, Asp531, and Glu539 of WNK1. The interaction between the RFXV motif and the autoinhibitory domain makes it possible for the C-terminal region of WNK4 to be in close proximity of the kinases domain and subsequently regulate its activity.

== Function ==
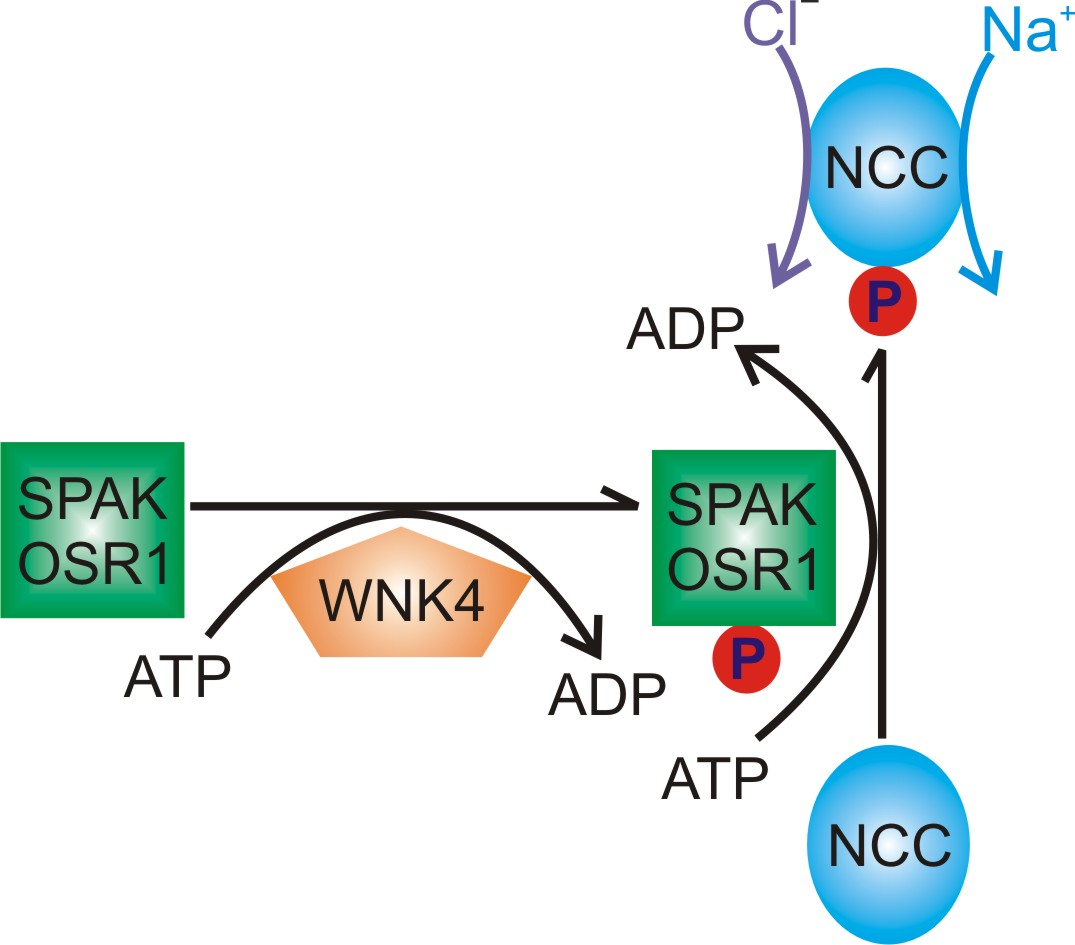
Fig. 2. The WNK4-SPAK/OSR1-NCC phosphorylation cascade. WNK4 phosphorylates and activates SPAK/OSR1, which in turn phosphorylate and activates NCC. In this manner, WNK4 regulates sodium reabsorption in the distal convoluted tubule and downstream potassium secretion through its positive effects on NCC.

As a typical kinase, WNK4 accomplishes the phosphorylation of its substrate proteins by adding a phosphate moiety in an ATP-dependent manner. This structural modification usually results in functional alterations of downstream substrates. Some currently known substrates of WNK4 includes kinases STE20-serine-proline alanine-rich kinase (SPAK) and oxidative stress response 1 kinase (OSR1), which in turn can phosphorylate and activate the thiazide-sensitive sodium-chloride cotransporter (NCC) (Fig. 2). Similarly, WNK4 activates NKCC1 and deactivate KCC2 through a SPAK-dependent mechanism. The kinase activity of WNK4 has been demonstrated in vitro using the WNK4 kinase domain purified from E. coli. This phosphorylation cascade is critical in regulating sodium and potassium homeostasis dysregulation which is tied to the pathogenesis of PHAII.

In addition to NCC, WNK4 also regulates multiple ions channels and cotransporters in the kidney through various mechanisms. These include epithelial Na^{+} channel (ENaC), renal outer medullary potassium channel (ROMK), transient receptor potential vanilloid member 4 and 5 (TRPV4/5, calcium channels), Na-K-2Cl cotransporter 1 and 2 (NKCC1/2), K^{+}-Cl^{−} cotransporter type 2 (KCC2), and other channels/transporters. WNK4 inhibits the functions of ENaC, ROMK, and TRPV4 by reducing the total and cell surface expression of these channels. WNK4 enhances TRPV5 by increasing its forward trafficking to the plasma membrane in a kinase-dependent manner. The inhibitory effect of WNK4 on ROMK is reversed by serum and glucocorticoid kinase 1 (SGK1) or by a corresponding phosphomimetic S1169D mutation on WNK4. The N-terminal segment of WNK4 containing the kinase domain and acidic motif is required for the WNK4-mediated inhibition of ROMK. The second coiled-coil domain of WNK4 mediates the downregulation of TRPV4. WNK4 and calcium-binding protein 39 (Cab39) act together to activate transporters NKCC1 and NKCC2.

== Role in pseudohypoaldosteronism type 2 ==
=== Dysregulation of WNK4 kinase activity ===
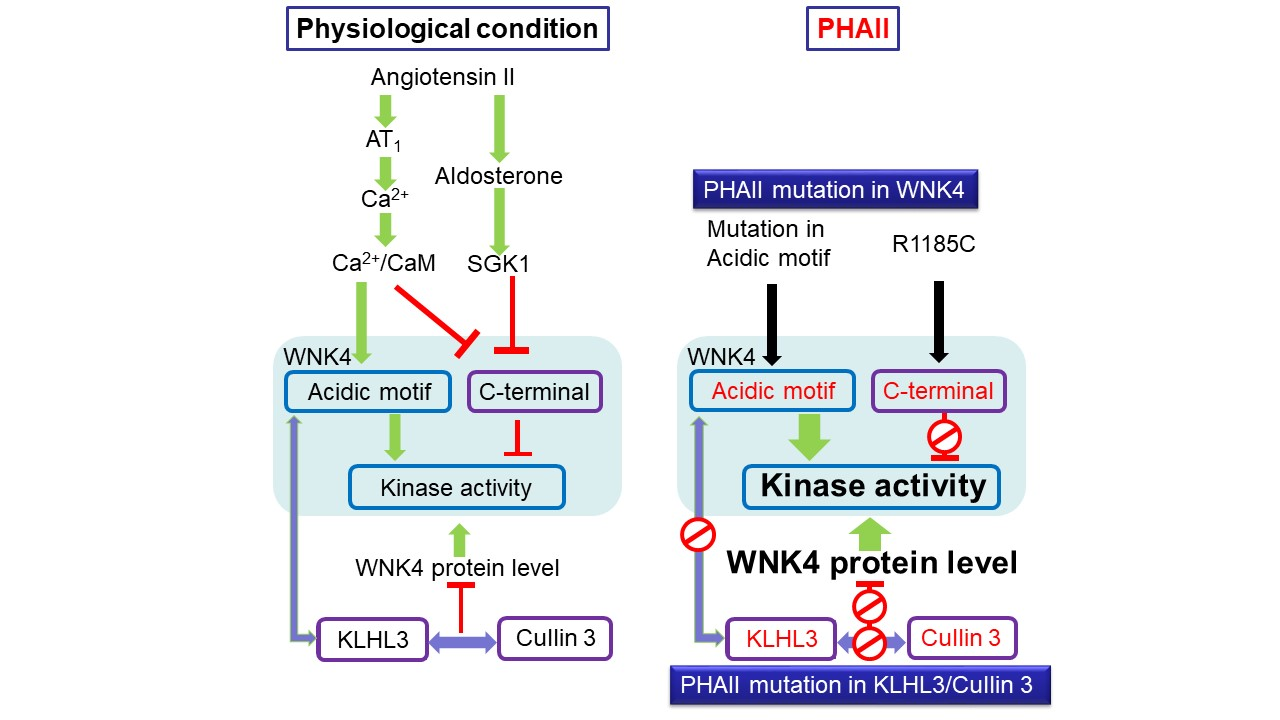
Fig. 3. Proposed mechanisms by which PHAII-causing mutations in WNK4, KLHL3, and Cullin 3 lead to increased kinase activity of WNK4. Left panel, under physiological condition, angiotensin II elicits an increase in intracellular Ca^{2+}. Ca^{2+} ions interact with the acidic motif of WNK4 and increase the kinase activity. Ca^{2+}/calmodulin (CaM) also binds to the C-terminal CaM-binding domain and relieves the inhibition of the kinase activity of WNK4. WNK4 protein is degraded by the KLHL3-Cullin 3 ubiquitin E3 ligase. Right panel, under PHAII condition, PHAII mutations in the acidic motif mimic the Ca^{2+} binding state and lead to an increase in kinase activity. The R1185C mutation relieves the inhibitory effect of the C-terminal domain on the kinase activity of WNK4. Mutations in KLHL3 or Cullin 3 impair the degradation of WNK4 protein, leading to an increase in total kinase activity.

In 2001, four missense mutations in the WNK4 gene were identified in patients with pseudohypoaldosteronism type 2 (PHAII) (Fig. 1). Three of these mutations (E562K, D564A, and Q565E) are charge-changing substitutions in the acidic motif of WNK4, which are conserved among all members of the WNK family in human and rodent species. The fourth substitution (R1185C) is located in the calmodulin-binding domain near the second coiled-coil domain. Few other PHAII mutations in WNK4 have also been reported. Examples of these mutations include E560G, P561L, and D564H, all of which are located close to or in the acidic motif; and K1169E which is located between the coiled-coil 2 and the calmodulin-binding domain. The PHAII mutations appear to disrupt the mechanisms underlying Ca^{2+}-sensitivity of WNK4 kinase. Two mechanisms are important in this regard. First, the PHAII-causing mutations in the acidic motif make the kinase domain insensitive to Ca^{2+} concentration. The acidic motif of WNK4 potentially acts as a Ca^{2+} sensor, and WNK4 kinase activity rises when Ca^{2+} concentration is elevated. This has been demonstrated using isolated WNK4 kinase domain truncated to contain the acidic motif. The kinase activity is elevated when a PHAII-causing mutation is present in the acidic motif, similar to what is observed in a Ca^{2+}-binding state (Fig. 3). Second, the WNK4 C-terminal region containing the calmodulin-binding domain and multiple SGK1 phosphorylation sites inhibits the WNK4 activity at the resting state. However, when Ca^{2+} levels are elevated, Ca^{2+}/calmodulin complex binds to the C-terminal region, derepressing WNK4 kinase activity. Additionally, the RFXV motif is believed to interact with the autoinhibitory domain and subsequently triggers a conformational change that brings the C-terminal and kinase domain close for the inhibitory effect to take place. Angiotensin II increases the SPAK phosphorylation and activates NCC through a WNK-dependent mechanism. The activation of SPAK and NCC by angiotensin II is abrogated by WNK4 knockdown. Activation of angiotensin II receptor AT1 couples to Gq/11 to activate phospholipase C and to increase the intracellular Ca^{2+} concentration. An increase in Ca^{2+} concentration then elevates WNK4 activity through mechanisms described above (Fig. 3, left panel). The PHAII-causing mutations in the acidic motif and the R1185C mutation in the calmodulin-binding domain constitutively activate the WNK4 kinase domain allowing it to function despite the absence of angiotensin II (Fig. 3, right panel).

Angiotensin II stimulates the secretion of aldosterone, which induces SGK1. SGK1 influences both the WNK-SPAK-NCC and SGK1-ENaC signaling cascades. There are multiple SGK1 phosphorylation sites in the C-terminal region of WNK4 located within or close to the calmodulin-binding domain. SGK1-mediated phosphorylation of these sites is thought to disrupt the effect of the C-terminal inhibitory domain and concomitantly increase WNK4 kinase activity. Additionally, it has been shown that PKA and PKC kinases are able to phosphorylate several sites of WNK4, which increases its activity. The alteration of SGK1 phosphorylation by the R1185C mutation is another indication that the mutation disrupts the C-terminal inhibitory mechanism in WNK4 (Fig. 3, right panel).

=== Dysregulation of WNK4 abundance ===
Besides WNK1 and WNK4, mutations in two other genes, CUL3 (encoding Cullin 3) and KLHL3 (encoding Kelch Like Family Member 3) have been found in patients with PHAII. These two proteins are part of the ubiquitin E3 ligase complex involved in the ubiquitin-mediated degradation of WNK1 and WNK4. The PHAII-causing mutations in KLHL3 and cullin 3 prevent the interactions of these proteins with each other and with WNK1/4. The mutations in these proteins impair the degradation of WNK1/4. This in turn increases the protein abundance of WNK1/4 and concomitantly enhances the total kinase activity. The increased WNK4 kinase activity leads to the hyperactivation of NCC through WNK4-SPAK/OSR1-NCC cascade, ultimately resulting in the retention of sodium and potassium by the kidney.

=== Elevated WNK4 activity ===
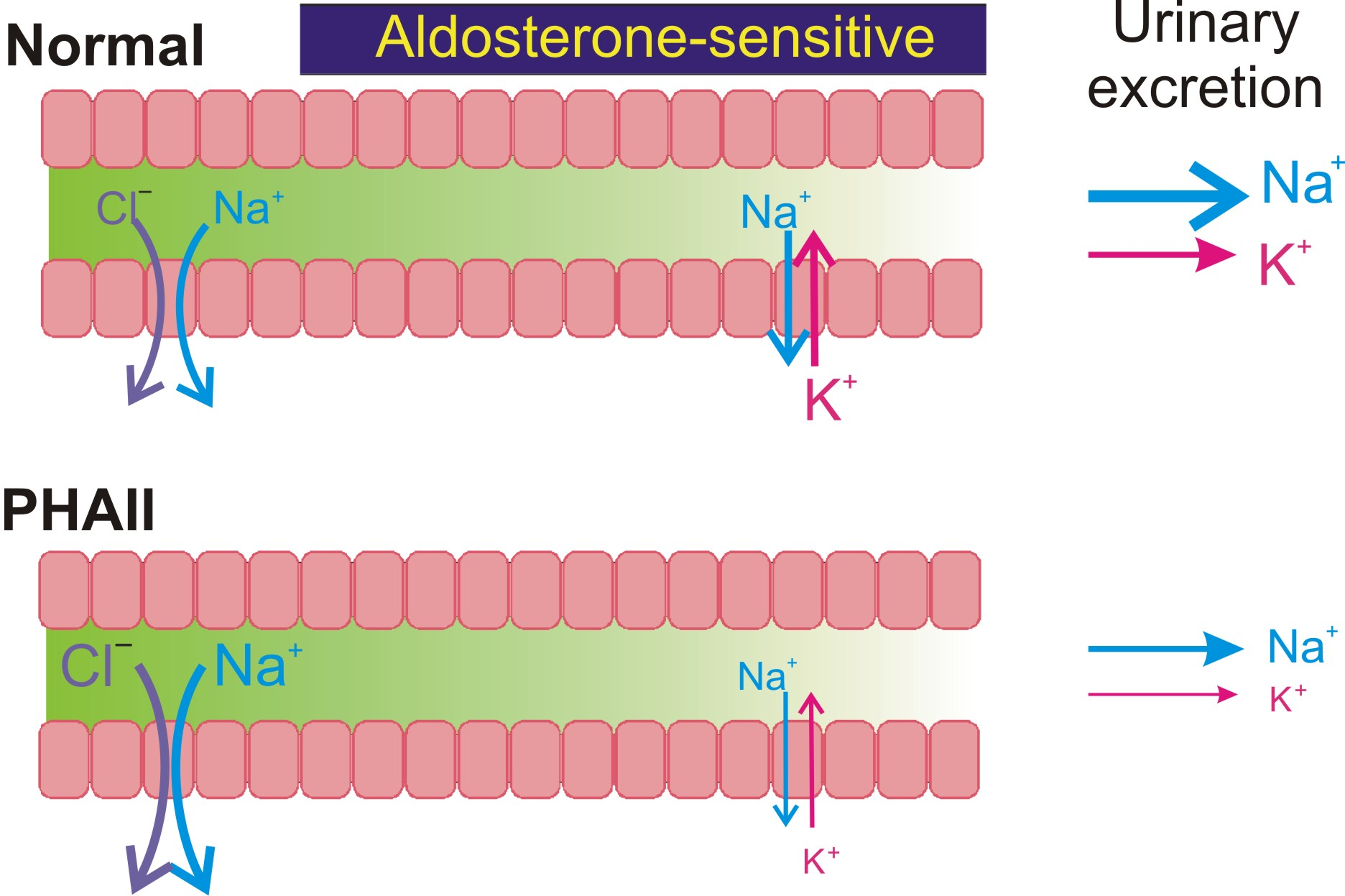
Fig. 4. The physiological consequence of elevated NCC activity due to the increased WNK4 kinase activity in PHAII. Shown are the renal tubule segments containing the distal convoluted tubule and the aldosterone-sensitive connecting tubule and collecting duct under normal and PHAII conditions due to mutations in WNK4, KLHL3, or cullin 3. The net effects of these mutations are to elevate WNK4 kinase activity in the distal convoluted tubule. This leads to the increased reabsorption of Na^{+} in the distal convoluted tubule and thereby less Na^{+} reabsorption and K^{+} secretion. The consequence is the retention of Na^{+} and K^{+}, leading to high blood pressure and hyperkalemia over time.

The primary effect of elevated WNK4 kinase activity is the increase of NCC-mediated sodium reabsorption in the distal convoluted tubule of the kidney. The increase in sodium reabsorption in this segment of the nephron reduces the sodium load in the collecting duct, where sodium reabsorption by the ENaC provides the driving force for potassium secretion through ROMK (Fig. 4). The sodium reabsorption by hyperactive NCC overrides the loss of reabsorption by ENaC, and the net effect is moderate sodium retention. Over time, this potentially contributes to the elevated blood pressure observed in PHAII patients. The reduction of potassium secretion by ROMK contributes to the development of hyperkalemia. The direct effects of the elevated WNK4 activity on other channels and transporters, such as ENaC, ROMK, and Ca^{2+}-activated maxi K^{+} channels, may also contribute to the pathogenesis of PHAII; however, the primary features of PHAII could be explained by the gain-of-function of NCC.
