= Sodium-chloride symporter =

Protein-coding gene in the species Homo sapiens

SLC12A3
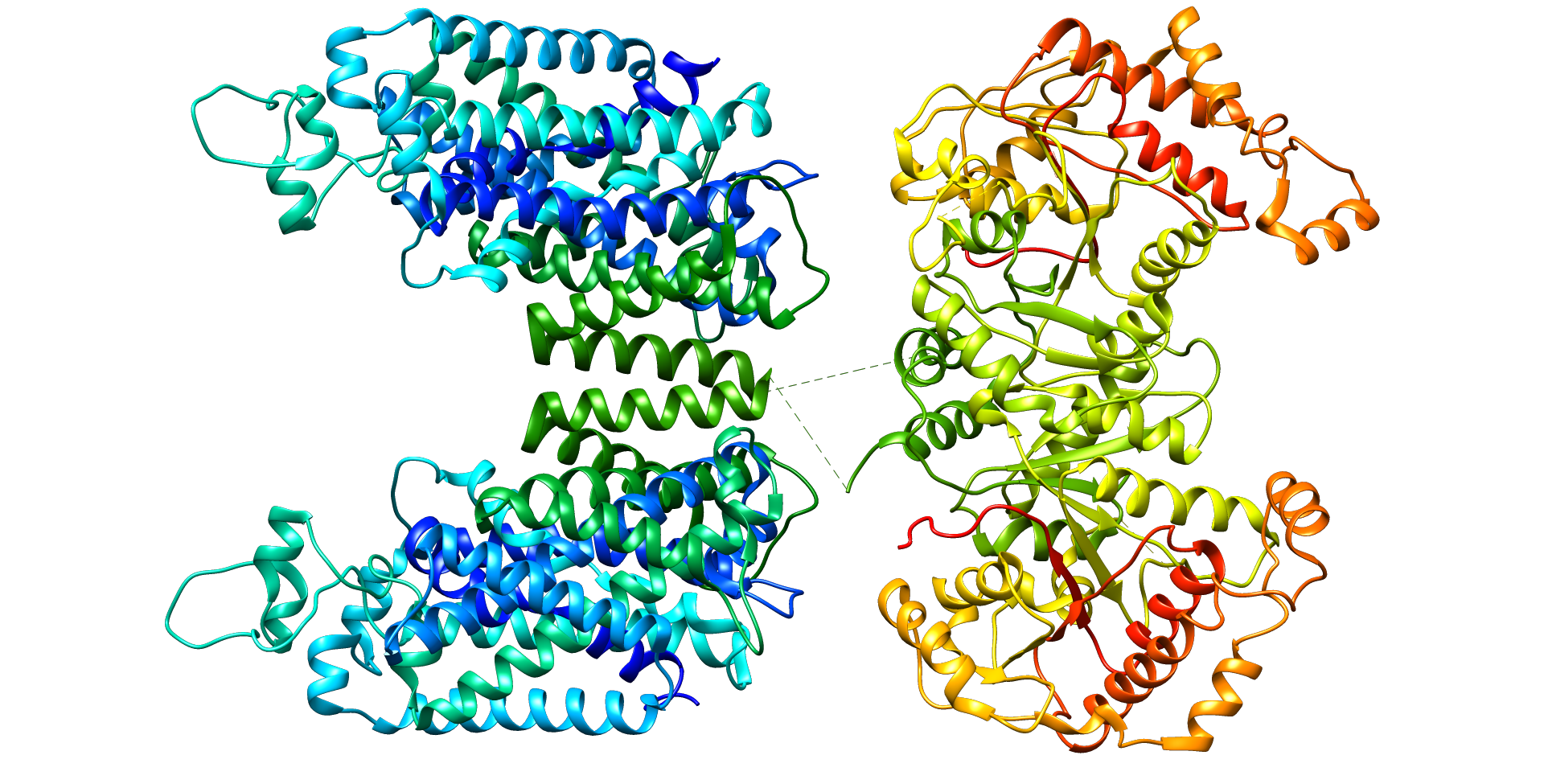

Identifiers
- Aliases: SLC12A3, NCC, NCCT, TSC, solute carrier family 12 member 3, Sodium-chloride symporter
- External IDs: OMIM: 600968; MGI: 108114; GeneCards: SLC12A3

Gene location (Human)
Chr.	Chromosome 16 (human)
Band	16q13	Start	56,865,207 bp
Band	16q13	End	56,915,850 bp

Gene location (Mouse)
Chr.	Chromosome 8 (mouse)
Band	8 C5|8 46.46 cM	Start	95,055,829 bp
Band	8 C5|8 46.46 cM	End	95,092,842 bp
RNA expression pattern
Bgee	Human / Mouse (ortholog); Top expressed in: kidney tubule; human kidney; buccal mucosa cell; glomerulus; renal medulla; pancreatic ductal cell; granulocyte; lymph node; mononuclear cell; spleen / Top expressed in: right kidney; human kidney; distal tubule; renal cortex; primary visual cortex; granulocyte; proximal tubule; bone marrow; metanephros; muscle of thigh; More reference expression data
BioGPS	n/a
Gene ontology
Molecular function	cation:chloride symporter activity; protein binding; symporter activity; transporter activity; sodium:chloride symporter activity; sodium:potassium:chloride symporter activity; sodium ion transmembrane transporter activity; potassium:chloride symporter activity
Cellular component	integral component of membrane; cytosol; plasma membrane; integral component of plasma membrane; extracellular exosome; apical plasma membrane; membrane
Biological process	chloride transmembrane transport; ion transport; sodium ion transmembrane transport; sodium ion transport; transmembrane transport; chloride transport; transport; cell volume homeostasis; chloride ion homeostasis; potassium ion homeostasis; sodium ion homeostasis; potassium ion import across plasma membrane
Sources:Amigo / QuickGO
Orthologs
Databases	NCBI: entry; OMA: entry
Species	Human	Mouse
Entrez	6559	20497
Ensembl	ENSG00000070915	ENSMUSG00000031766
UniProt	P55017	P59158
RefSeq (mRNA)	NM_000339; NM_001126107; NM_001126108	NM_001205311; NM_019415
RefSeq (protein)	NP_000330; NP_001119579; NP_001119580	NP_001192240; NP_062288
Location (UCSC)	Chr 16: 56.87 – 56.92 Mb	Chr 8: 95.06 – 95.09 Mb
PubMed search
- Wikidata
View/Edit Human	View/Edit Mouse

The sodium-chloride symporter (also known as Na^{+}-Cl^{−} cotransporter, NCC or NCCT, or as the thiazide-sensitive Na^{+}-Cl^{−} cotransporter or TSC) is a cotransporter in the kidney which has the function of reabsorbing sodium and chloride ions from the tubular fluid into the cells of the distal convoluted tubule of the nephron. It is a member of the SLC12 cotransporter family of electroneutral cation-coupled chloride cotransporters. In humans, it is encoded by the SLC12A3 gene (solute carrier family 12 member 3) located in 16q13.

A loss of NCC function causes Gitelman syndrome, an autosomic recessive disease characterized by salt wasting and low blood pressure, hypokalemic metabolic alkalosis, hypomagnesemia and hypocalciuria. Over a hundred different mutations in the NCC gene have been identified.

== Molecular biology ==
The sodium-chloride symporter or NCC is a member of the SLC12 cotransporter family of electroneutral cation-coupled chloride cotransporter, along with the potassium-chloride cotransporters (K^{+}-Cl^{−} cotransporters or KCCs), the sodium-potassium-chloride cotransporters (Na^{+}-K^{+}-Cl^{−} cotransporters or NKCCs) and orphan member CIP (cotransporter interacting protein) and CCC9. The sodium-chloride symporter's protein sequence has a high degree of identity between different mammalian species (over 90% between human, rat and mouse). The SLC12A3 gene encodes for a protein of 1,002 to 1,030 amino acid residues. NCC is a transmembrane protein, presumed to have a hydrophobic core of either 10 or 12 transmembrane domains with intracellular amino- and carboxyl-terminus domains. The exact structure of the NCC protein is unknown, as it has not yet been crystallized. The NCC protein forms homodimers at the plasma membrane.

N-glycosylation occurs in two sites in a long extracellular loop connecting two transmembrane domains within the hydrophobic core. This posttranslational modification is necessary for proper folding and transport of the protein to the plasma membrane.

== Function ==
Because NCC is located at the apical membrane of the distal convoluted tubule of the nephron, it faces the lumen of the tubule and is in contact with the tubular fluid. Using the sodium gradient across the apical membrane of the cells in distal convoluted tubule, the sodium-chloride symporter transports Na^{+} and Cl^{−} from the tubular fluid into these cells. Afterward, the Na^{+} is pumped out of the cell and into the bloodstream by the Na^{+}-K^{+} ATPase located at the basal membrane and the Cl^{−} leaves the cells through the basolateral chloride channel ClC-Kb. The sodium-chloride symporter accounts for the absorption of 5% of the salt filtered at the glomerulus. NCC activity is known to have two control mechanisms affecting protein trafficking to the plasma membrane and transporter kinetics by phosphorylation and de-phosphorylation of conserved serine/threonine residues.

As NCC has to be at the plasma membrane to function, its activity can be regulated by increasing or decreasing the amount of protein at the plasma membrane. Some NCC modulators, such as the WNK3 and WNK4 kinases may regulate the amount of NCC at the cell surface by inducing the insertion or removal, respectively, of the protein from the plasma membrane.

Furthermore, many residues of NCC can be phosphorylated or dephosphorylated to activate or inhibit NCC uptake of Na^{+} and Cl^{−}. Other NCC modulators, including intracellular chloride depletion, angiotensin II, aldosterone and vasopressin, can regulate NCC activity by phosphorylating conserved serine/threonine residues. NCC activity can be inhibited by thiazides, which is why this symporter is also known as the thiazide-sensitive Na^{+}-Cl^{−} cotransporter.

== Pathology ==
=== Gitelman syndrome ===
A loss of NCC function is associated with Gitelman syndrome, an autosomic recessive disease characterized by salt wasting and low blood pressure, hypokalemic metabolic alkalosis, hypomagnesemia and hypocalciuria.

Over a hundred different mutations in the NCC gene have been described as causing Gitelman syndrome, including nonsense, frameshift, splice site and missense mutations. Two different types of mutations exist within the group of missense mutations causing loss of NCC function. Type I mutations cause a complete loss of NCC function, in which the synthesized protein is not properly glycosylated. NCC protein harboring type I mutations is retained in the endoplasmic reticulum and cannot be trafficked to the cell surface. Type II mutations cause a partial loss of NCC function in which the cotransporter is trafficked to the cell surface but has an impaired insertion in the plasma membrane. NCC harboring type II mutations have normal kinetic properties but are present in lower amounts at the cell surface, resulting in a decreased uptake of sodium and chloride. NCC harboring type II mutations is still under control of its modulators and can still increase or decrease its activity in response to stimuli, whereas type I mutations cause a complete loss of function and regulation of the cotransporter. However, in some patients with Gitelman's syndrome, no mutations in the NCC gene have been found despite extensive genetic work-up.

=== Hypertension and blood pressure ===
NCC has also been implicated to play a role in control of blood pressure in the open population, with both common polymorphisms and rare mutations altering NCC function, renal salt reabsorption and, presumably, blood pressure. Individuals with rare mutations in genes responsible for salt control in the kidney, including NCC, have been found to have a lower blood pressure than controls. NCC harboring these mutations has a lower function than wild-type cotransporter although some mutations found in individuals in the open population seem to be less deleterious to cotransporter function than mutations in individuals with Gitelman's syndrome.

Furthermore, heterozygous carriers of mutations causing Gitelman syndrome (i.e. individuals who have a mutation in one of the two alleles and do not have the disease) have a lower blood pressure than non-carriers in the same family.

=== Pseudohypoaldosteronism type II ===
Type II pseudohypoaldosteronism (PHA2), also known as Gordon's syndrome or Familial Hyperkalemic Hypertension (FHHt), is an autosomal dominant disease in which there is an increase in NCC activity leading to short stature, increased blood pressure, increased serum K^{+} levels, increased urinary calcium excretion and hyperchloremic metabolic acidosis. However, PHA2 is not caused by mutations within the SLC12A3 (corresponding to NCC) gene, but by mutations in NCC regulators WNK1, WNK4, KLHL3 and CUL3. Patients respond well to treatment with thiazide-type diuretics.

== See also ==
- Nephron
- Distal convoluted tubule
- Electrolytes, such as sodium and chloride
- Cotransporter, including symporter
- Blood pressure
- Diuretics and thiazides
