= Kelch-like protein 12 =

Protein found in humans

KLHL12

Identifiers
- Aliases: KLHL12, C3IP1, DKIR, hDKIR, kelch like family member 12
- External IDs: OMIM: 614522; MGI: 2385619; GeneCards: KLHL12
Available structures
PDB	Ortholog search: PDBe RCSB
PDB	List of PDB id codes 2VPJ

Gene location (Human)
Chr.	Chromosome 1 (human)
Band	1q32.1	Start	202,891,116 bp
Band	1q32.1	End	202,928,636 bp

Gene location (Mouse)
Chr.	Chromosome 1 (mouse)
Band	1|1 E4	Start	134,383,269 bp
Band	1|1 E4	End	134,418,756 bp
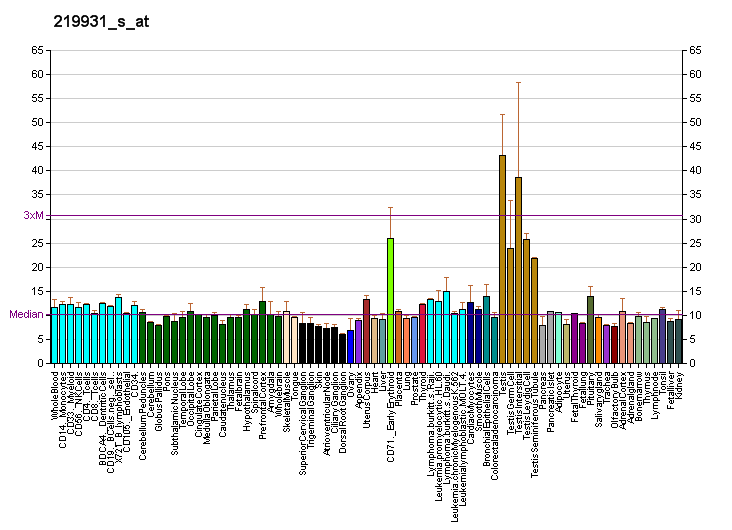
RNA expression pattern
Bgee	Human / Mouse (ortholog); Top expressed in: oocyte; secondary oocyte; mucosa of ileum; myocardium of left ventricle; gonad; cardiac muscle tissue of right atrium; middle temporal gyrus; sperm; ventricular zone; right testis / Top expressed in: otolith organ; utricle; hand; substantia nigra; neural layer of retina; Paneth cell; granulocyte; trigeminal ganglion; epithelium of lens; tail of embryo; More reference expression data
BioGPS	More reference expression data
Gene ontology
Molecular function	ubiquitin-protein transferase activity; protein binding; identical protein binding
Cellular component	cytosol; COPII-coated ER to Golgi transport vesicle; Cul3-RING ubiquitin ligase complex; intracellular membrane-bounded organelle; cytoplasmic vesicle; microtubule organizing center; Golgi membrane; COPII vesicle coat
Biological process	COPII vesicle coating; Wnt signaling pathway; protein monoubiquitination; negative regulation of canonical Wnt signaling pathway; vesicle-mediated transport; protein ubiquitination; endoplasmic reticulum to Golgi vesicle-mediated transport; neural crest formation; neural crest cell development
Sources:Amigo / QuickGO
Orthologs
Databases	NCBI: entry; OMA: entry
Species	Human	Mouse
Entrez	59349	240756
Ensembl	ENSG00000117153	ENSMUSG00000026455
UniProt	Q53G59	Q8BZM0
RefSeq (mRNA)	NM_001303051; NM_001303109; NM_021633	NM_153128; NM_001311136
RefSeq (protein)	NP_001289980; NP_001290038; NP_067646	NP_001298065; NP_694768
Location (UCSC)	Chr 1: 202.89 – 202.93 Mb	Chr 1: 134.38 – 134.42 Mb
PubMed search
- Wikidata
View/Edit Human	View/Edit Mouse

Kelch-like protein 12 is a protein that in humans is encoded by the KLHL12 gene.

== Interactions ==
KLHL12 has been shown to interact with RIT1 and CUL3.
