= RIT1 =

Protein-coding gene in humans

Identifiers
- Aliases: RIT1, NS8, RIBB, RIT, ROC1, Ras like without CAAX 1
- External IDs: OMIM: 609591; MGI: 108053; GeneCards: RIT1
Available structures
PDB	Ortholog search: PDBe RCSB
PDB	List of PDB id codes 4KLZ
Enzyme activity
EC #	BRENDA	ExPASy	KEGG	MetaCyc
3.6.5.2	↗	↗	↗	↗

Gene location (Human)
Chr.	Chromosome 1 (human)
Band	1q22	Start	155,897,808 bp
Band	1q22	End	155,911,404 bp

Gene location (Mouse)
Chr.	Chromosome 3 (mouse)
Band	3|3 F1	Start	88,624,145 bp
Band	3|3 F1	End	88,638,356 bp
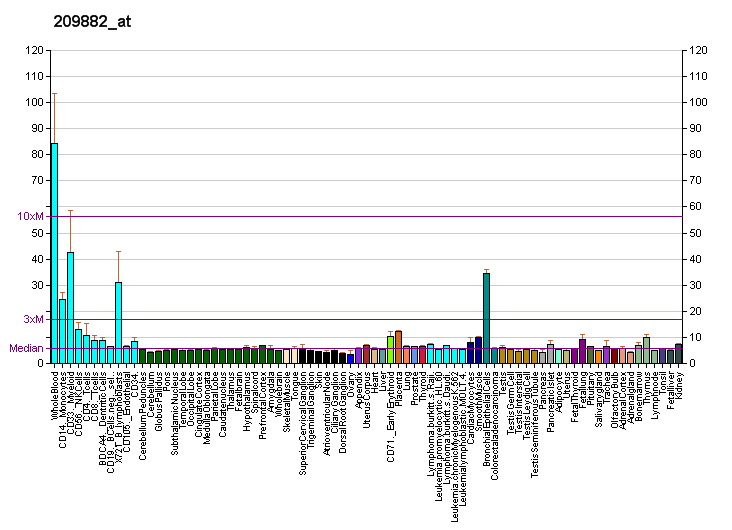
RNA expression pattern
Bgee	Human / Mouse (ortholog); Top expressed in: monocyte; amniotic fluid; Achilles tendon; stromal cell of endometrium; islet of Langerhans; blood; ventricular zone; vagina; palpebral conjunctiva; granulocyte / Top expressed in: granulocyte; saccule; stroma of bone marrow; seminal vesicula; lip; ectoderm; otic vesicle; esophagus; lacrimal gland; otic placode; More reference expression data
BioGPS	More reference expression data
Gene ontology
Molecular function	nucleotide binding; protein binding; calmodulin binding; GTP binding; GTPase activity; GDP binding
Cellular component	membrane; plasma membrane; intracellular anatomical structure
Biological process	Ras protein signal transduction; signal transduction
Sources:Amigo / QuickGO
Orthologs
Databases	NCBI: entry; OMA: entry
Species	Human	Mouse
Entrez	6016	19769
Ensembl	ENSG00000143622	ENSMUSG00000028057
UniProt	Q92963	P70426
RefSeq (mRNA)	NM_006912; NM_001256820; NM_001256821	NM_001163310; NM_009069
RefSeq (protein)	NP_001243749; NP_001243750; NP_008843	NP_001156782; NP_033095; NP_001390950; NP_001390951; NP_001390958 NP_001390959; NP_001390960; NP_001390962; NP_001390963; NP_001390964; NP_001390965
Location (UCSC)	Chr 1: 155.9 – 155.91 Mb	Chr 3: 88.62 – 88.64 Mb
PubMed search
- Wikidata
View/Edit Human	View/Edit Mouse

GTP-binding protein Rit1 is a protein that in humans is encoded by the RIT1 gene.

== Function ==
RIT belongs to the RAS (HRAS; MIM 190020) subfamily of small GTPases (Hynds et al., 2003).[supplied by OMIM]

== Clinical significance ==
Mutations in RIT1 are associated to Noonan syndrome.

== Interactions ==
RIT1 has been shown to interact with KLHL12 and Merlin.
