= WNK1 =

Protein-coding gene in the species Homo sapiens

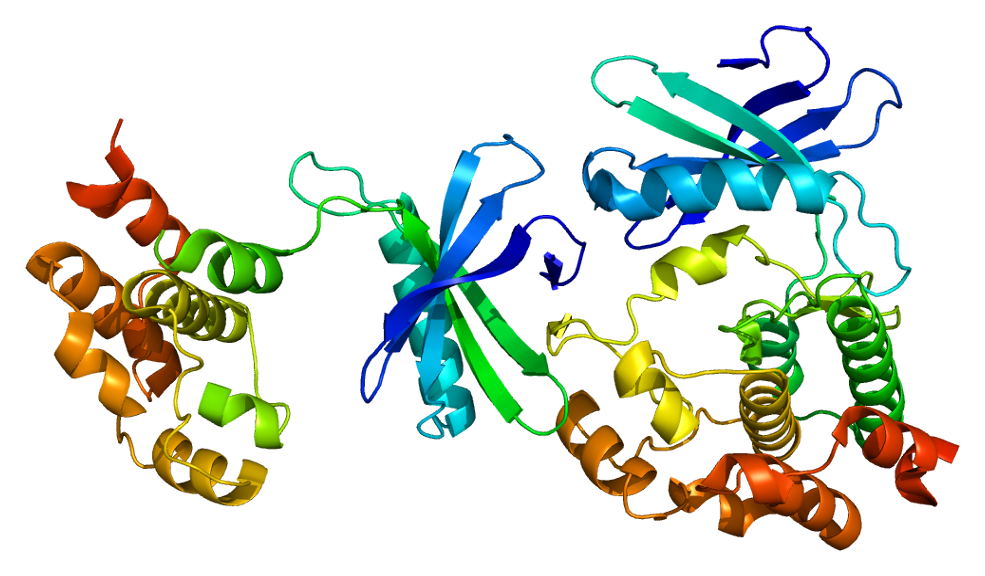

Identifiers
- Aliases: WNK1, HSAN2, HSN2, KDP, PPP1R167, PRKPSK, p65, WNK lysine deficient protein kinase 1
- External IDs: OMIM: 605232; MGI: 2442092; GeneCards: WNK1
Available structures
| PDB | Ortholog search: PDBe RCSB |
| PDB | List of PDB id codes 4PWN |
Enzyme activity
| EC # | BRENDA | ExPASy | KEGG | MetaCyc |
|---|---|---|---|---|
| 2.7.11.1 | ↗ | ↗ | ↗ | ↗ |

Gene location (Human)
| Chr. | Chromosome 12 (human) |
| Band | 12p13.33 | Start | 752,579 bp |
| Band | 12p13.33 | End | 911,452 bp |

Gene location (Mouse)
| Chr. | Chromosome 6 (mouse) |
| Band | 6|6 F1 | Start | 119,923,969 bp |
| Band | 6|6 F1 | End | 120,038,672 bp |
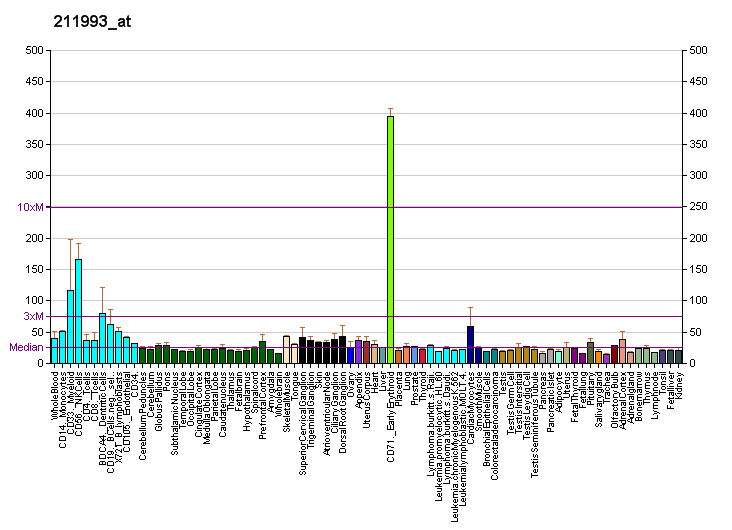

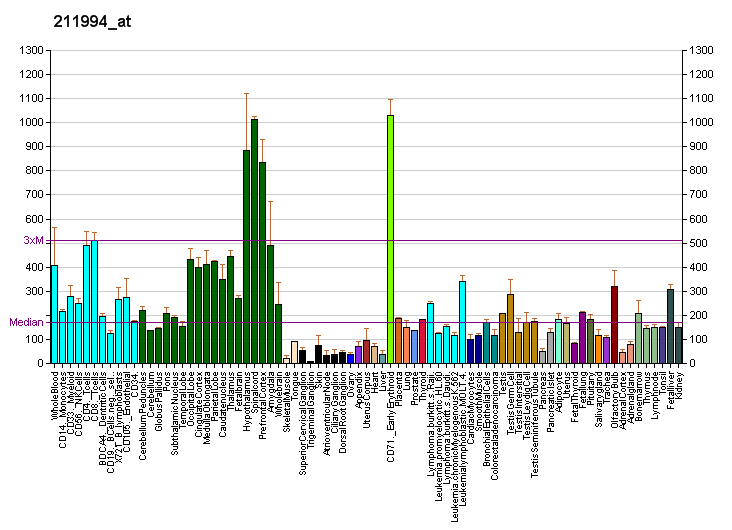

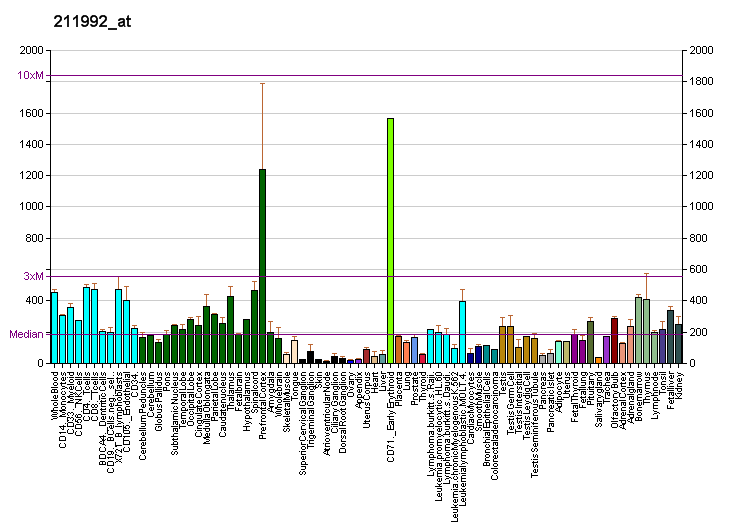
RNA expression pattern
| Bgee | Human / Mouse (ortholog); Top expressed in: internal globus pallidus; inferior ganglion of vagus nerve; subthalamic nucleus; dorsal motor nucleus of vagus nerve; external globus pallidus; optic nerve; pars reticulata; trabecular bone; pars compacta; inferior olivary nucleus / Top expressed in: endothelial cell of lymphatic vessel; stroma of bone marrow; gastrula; right lung lobe; vestibular membrane of cochlear duct; saccule; primary oocyte; myocardium of ventricle; ciliary body; cardiac muscle tissue of left ventricle; More reference expression data |
| BioGPS | More reference expression data |
Gene ontology
| Molecular function | protein serine/threonine kinase inhibitor activity; transferase activity; nucleotide binding; potassium channel inhibitor activity; phosphatase binding; protein kinase inhibitor activity; kinase activity; protein binding; chloride channel inhibitor activity; magnesium ion binding; protein serine/threonine kinase activity; ATP binding; protein kinase activity; protein kinase binding; protein kinase activator activity |
| Cellular component | cytoplasm; cytosol; membrane |
| Biological process | phosphorylation; negative regulation of phosphatase activity; neuron development; positive regulation of systemic arterial blood pressure; protein autophosphorylation; negative regulation of protein serine/threonine kinase activity; peptidyl-threonine phosphorylation; negative regulation of pancreatic juice secretion; negative regulation of kinase activity; regulation of cellular process; ion transport; intracellular signal transduction; negative regulation of protein kinase activity; regulation of sodium ion transport; protein phosphorylation; negative regulation of sodium ion transport; activation of protein kinase activity; cellular response to calcium ion; positive regulation of canonical Wnt signaling pathway; positive regulation of T cell chemotaxis; peptidyl-serine phosphorylation; positive regulation of ion transmembrane transporter activity; negative regulation of cell-cell adhesion mediated by integrin; negative regulation of heterotypic cell-cell adhesion; negative regulation of GTPase activity; chemokine (C-C motif) ligand 21 signaling pathway; ion homeostasis; T cell receptor signaling pathway; lymphocyte migration into lymph node; negative regulation of leukocyte cell-cell adhesion; positive regulation of potassium ion import across plasma membrane; cellular response to chemokine; positive regulation of sodium ion transmembrane transporter activity |
Sources:Amigo / QuickGO
Orthologs
| Databases | NCBI: entry; OMA: entry |
| Species | Human | Mouse |
| Entrez | 65125 | 232341 |
| Ensembl | ENSG00000060237 | ENSMUSG00000045962 |
| UniProt | Q9H4A3 | P83741 |
| RefSeq (mRNA) | NM_001184985; NM_014823; NM_018979; NM_213655 | NM_001037155; NM_001185020; NM_001185021; NM_001199083; NM_001199084 NM_198703 |
| RefSeq (protein) | NP_001171914; NP_055638; NP_061852; NP_998820 | NP_001171949; NP_001171950; NP_001186012; NP_001186013; NP_941992 |
| Location (UCSC) | Chr 12: 0.75 – 0.91 Mb | Chr 6: 119.92 – 120.04 Mb |
| PubMed search |
- Wikidata
| View/Edit Human | View/Edit Mouse |

WNK (lysine deficient protein kinase 1), also known as WNK1, is an enzyme that is encoded by the WNK1 gene. WNK1 is serine-threonine protein kinase and part of the "with no lysine/K" kinase WNK family. The predominant role of WNK1 is the regulation of cation-Cl^{−} cotransporters (CCCs) such as the sodium chloride cotransporter (NCC), basolateral Na-K-Cl symporter (NKCC1), and potassium chloride cotransporter (KCC1) located within the kidney. CCCs mediate ion homeostasis and modulate blood pressure by transporting ions in and out of the cell. WNK1 mutations as a result have been implicated in blood pressure disorders/diseases; a prime example being familial hyperkalemic hypertension (FHHt).

== Structure ==
The WNK1 protein is composed of 2382 amino acids (molecular weight 230 kDa). The protein contains a kinase domain located within its short N-terminaldomain and a long C-terminal tail. The kinase domain has some similarity to the MEKK protein kinase family. As a member of the WNK family, the kinase's catalytic lysine residue is uniquely located in beta strand 2 of the glycine loop. In order to have kinase activity, WNK1 must autophosphorylate the serine 382 residue found in its activation loop. Further, phosphorylation at another site (Ser378) increases WNK1 activity. An autoinhibitory domain is located within the C-terminal domain along with a HQ domain that is needed for WNK1 interactions with other WNKs. The interactions between WNKs play an important role in function; WNK1 mutants that lack an HQ domain also lack kinase activity.

== Function ==
The WNK1 gene encodes a cytoplasmic serine-threonine kinase expressed in the distal nephron. Studies have shown that WNK1 can activate multiple CCCs. WNK1 however, does not directly phosphorylate the CCCs themselves rather it phosphorylates other serine-threonine kinases: Sterile20 related proline-alanine-rich kinase (SPAK) and oxidative stress response kinase 1 (OXSR1). Phosphorylation of SPAK's T loop located in its catalytic domain will activate SPAK, which will go on to phosphorylation the CCC's N-terminaldomain. Hence, WNK1 activates CCCs indirectly as an upstream regulator of SPAK/OSR1.

=== Sodium reabsorption ===
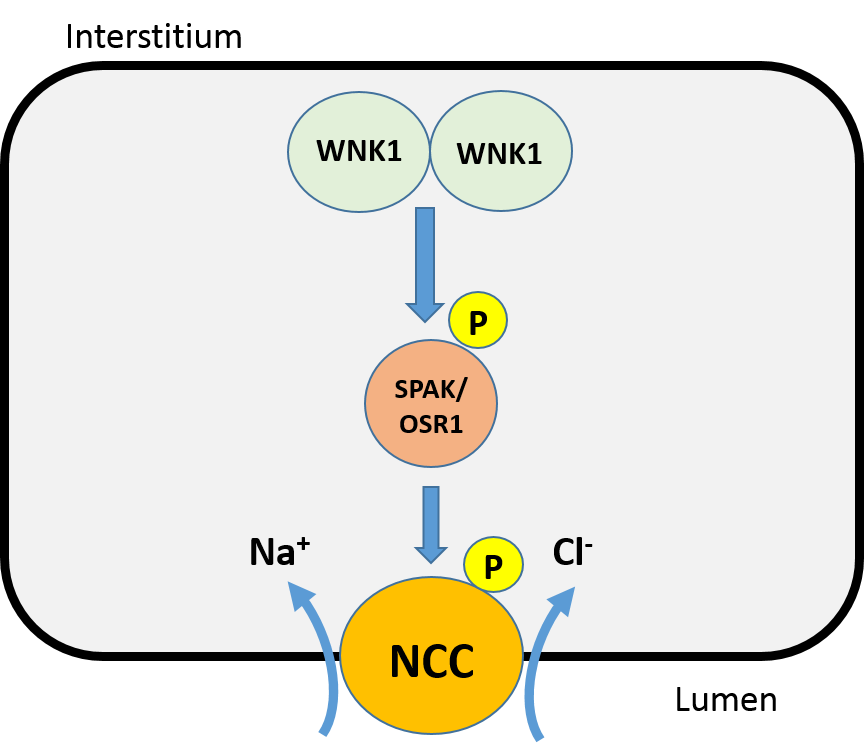
WNK1 homodimer phosphorylates SPAK/OSR1, which then subsequently activates the NCC via phosphorylation. Activated NCC allows the influx of Na^{+} ions and Cl^{−} ions.

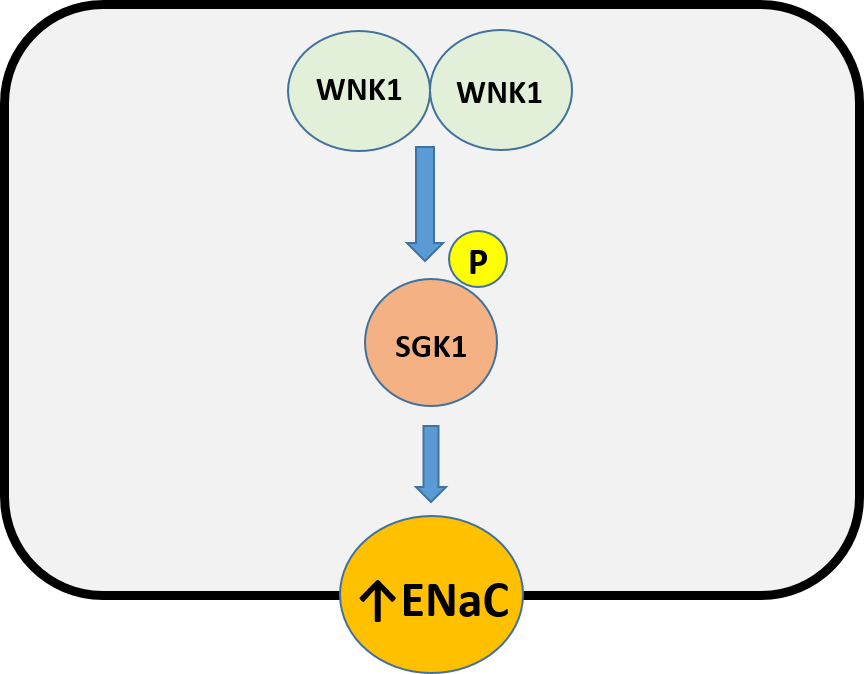
WNK1 homodimer phosphorylates SGK1 which leads to increased ENaC expression.

In the distal convoluted tubule (DCT), WNK1 is a potent activator of the NCC that results in an increase in sodium re absorption that drives an increase in blood pressure. The WNK1 mutant found in FHHt harbors a large deletion within intron 1 that causes an increase in the expression of full length WNK1. The boost in WNK1 leads to increases in NCC activation that promotes the high blood pressure/hypertension associated with FHHt. WNK1 activates the serum-and glucocorticoid-inducible protein kinase SGK1, leading to increased expression of the epithelial sodium channel (ENaC), which also promotes sodium re absorption.

=== Potassium secretion ===
WNK1 regulates potassium channels found in the cortical collecting duct (CCD) and connecting tubule (CNT). Renal outer medullar potassium 1 (ROMK1) and large conductance calcium-activated potassium channel (BKCa) are the two primary channels for potassium secretion. WNK1 indirectly stimulates clathrin-dependent endocytosis of ROMK1 by a potential interaction with intersectin (ITSN1); thus, kinase activity is not needed. Another possible mechanism of ROMK1 regulation is via autosomal recessive hypercholesterolemia (ACH), which is a clathrin adaptor molecule. ACH phosphorylation by WNK1 promotes the translocation of ROMK1 to clathrin coated pits triggering endocytosis. WNK1 may indirectly activate BKCa by inhibiting the actions of extracellular signal–regulated kinases (ERK1 and ERK2) that lead to lysomal degradation.

=== Cell volume regulation ===
The NKCC1/2 cotransporters are regulated by intracellular Cl^{−} concentration. Studies point to WNK1 as key effector that couples Cl^{−} concentration to NKCC1/2 function. In hypertonic (high extracellular Cl^{−} ) conditions that trigger cell shrinkage, an unknown mechanism upregulates WNK1 expression to counteract the volume loss. The increased WNK1 leads to activation of SPAK/OSR1 that activate NKCC1/2 via subsequent phosphorylation. NKCC1/2 will promote the influx of Na^{+}, K^{+}, and Cl^{−} ions into the cell thereby causing the flow of water into the cell. In the reverse circumstances, where hypotonic (low extracellular Cl^{−} ) conditions induce cell swelling, WNK1 is inhibited. Another cotransporter, KCC is inactive when phosphorylated; without activated WNK1, KCC does not undergo phosphorylation and can activate. The cotransporter will promote the efflux of K^{+} and Cl^{−} ions and cause the flow of water out of the cell to combat swelling.

=== WNK1 in the brain ===
In the mature brain, the GABA neurotransmitter represents the major inhibitory signal used in neuronal signaling. GABA activates the GABA_{A} receptor which is a Cl^{−} ion channel. Cl^{−} ions will enter the neuron causing hyperpolarization and inhibition of signaling. During brain development however, GABA_{A} activation will allow Cl^{−} ions to leave the neuron causing the neuron to depolarize. Thus, GABA is an excitatory neurotransmitter during development. WNK1 has been implicated in the developmental switch from excitatory to inhibitory GABA signaling via interaction with NKCC1 and KCCs. WNK1 phosphorylates SPAK/OSR1 which then phosphorylates KCC2 inhibiting the flow of Cl^{−} ions out of the cell during development.

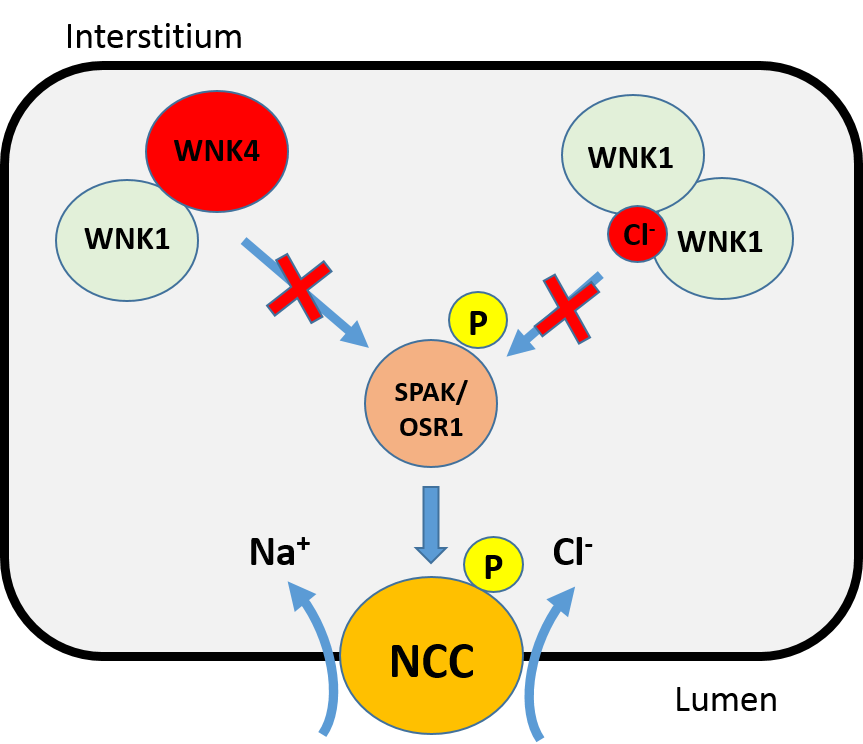
WNK4 binds WNK1 inhibiting WNK1 activation. Cl^{−} ions bind the WNK1 homodimer inhibiting kinase activity. Both of these mechanisms prevent the activation of the NCC.

== Regulation of WNK1 ==
The concentrations of Cl^{−} ions and K^{+} ion play a major role in regulating WNK1 activity. In the DCT, the plasma concentration of K^{+} ion is thought to impact the concentration Cl^{−} ions within the nephron. High plasma K^{+} concentration down regulates WNK1 activity and prevents Cl^{−} ion from entering the nephron via the NCC. The opposite occurs when plasma K^{+} concentration is low; increased WNK1 activity boosts NCC activity promoting reabsorption of Cl^{−} ions. When there is an abundance of Cl^{−} ions within the nephron, WNK1 activity is inhibited by the binding of a Cl^{−} ion to WNK1's catalytic domain.

Furthermore, WNK1 and WNK4 may interact to form heterodimers that inhibit WNK1 function. WNK4 release from the heterodimer allows WNK1 monomer to bind another WNK1 monomer to promote activation. WNK1 function can also be inhibited if WNK1 is degraded. There are two enzymes responsible for WNK1 ubiquitination, kelch like 3 (KLHL3) and cullin 3 (CUL3). KLHL3 serves as an adaptor protein that promotes the interaction between WNK1 and Cullin3, which is in a complex containing an E3 ubiquitin ligase that attaches the ubiquitin molecules to WNK1. The ubiquitinated WNK1 will subsequently undergo proteasomal degradation.

== Clinical significance ==
WNK1 has mutations associated with Gordon hyperkalemia-hypertension syndrome (pseudohypoaldosteronism Type II, featuring hypertension also called familial hyperkalemic hypertension (FHHt) ) and congenital sensory neuropathy (HSAN Type II, featuring loss of perception to pain, touch, and heat due to a loss of peripheral sensory nerves).

== Comparative genomics ==
The gene belongs to a group of four related protein kinases (WNK1, WNK2, WNK3, WNK4).

Homologs of this protein have been found in Arabidopsis thaliana, C. elegans, Chlamydomonas reinhardtii and Vitis viniferaas well as in vertebrates including Danio rerio and Taeniopygia guttata.
