= Cullin-3 =

Protein found in humans

CUL3
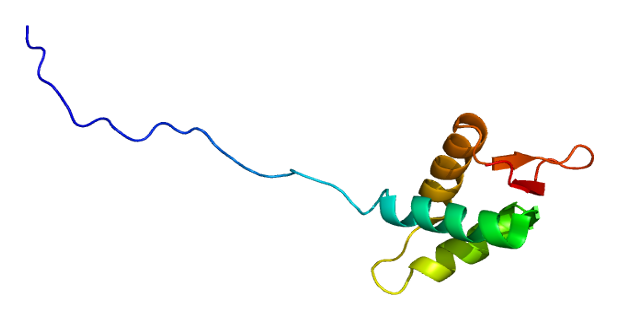

Identifiers
- Aliases: CUL3, CUL-3, PHA2E, cullin 3, NEDAUS
- External IDs: OMIM: 603136; MGI: 1347360; GeneCards: CUL3
Available structures
PDB	Ortholog search: PDBe RCSB
PDB	List of PDB id codes 2MYL, 2MYM, 4AP2, 4APF, 4EOZ, 4HXI

Gene location (Human)
Chr.	Chromosome 2 (human)
Band	2q36.2	Start	224,470,150 bp
Band	2q36.2	End	224,585,397 bp

Gene location (Mouse)
Chr.	Chromosome 1 (mouse)
Band	1|1 C5	Start	80,242,640 bp
Band	1|1 C5	End	80,318,197 bp
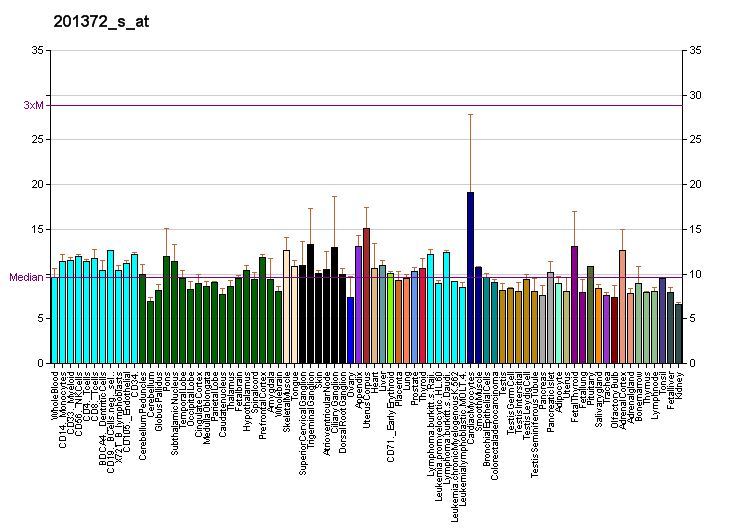

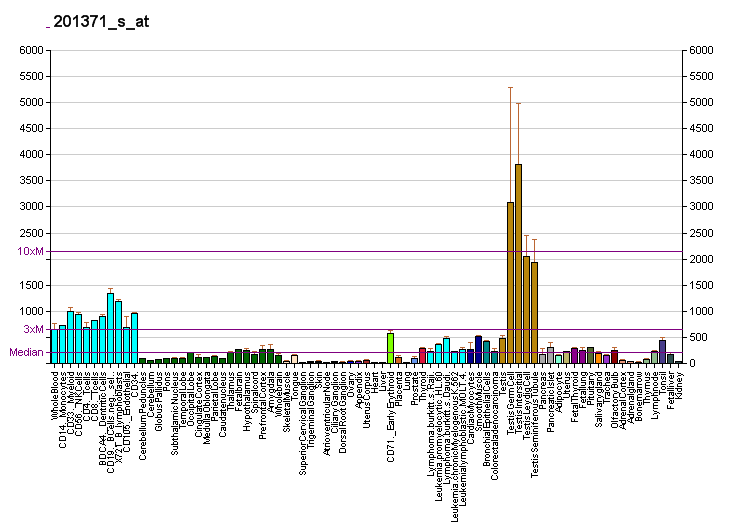

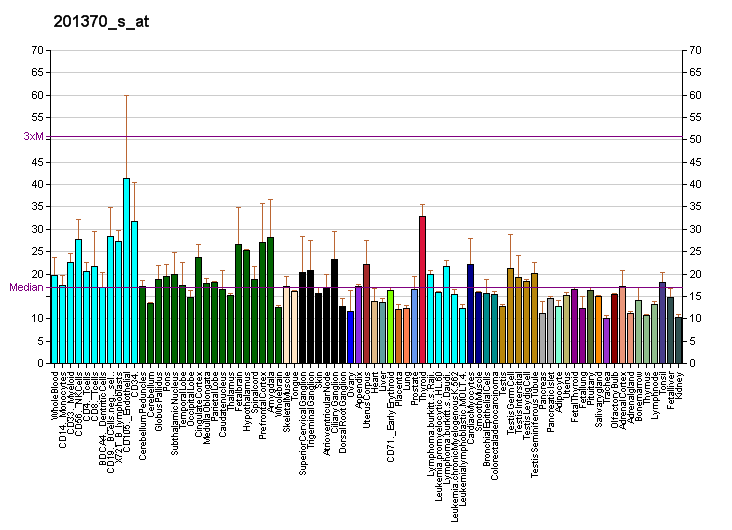
RNA expression pattern
Bgee	Human / Mouse (ortholog); Top expressed in: sperm; left testis; right testis; amniotic fluid; epithelium of nasopharynx; glutes; Achilles tendon; parotid gland; oral cavity; palpebral conjunctiva / Top expressed in: spermatid; spermatocyte; seminiferous tubule; triceps brachii muscle; tail of embryo; extensor digitorum longus muscle; muscle of thigh; quadriceps femoris muscle; gastrocnemius muscle; sternocleidomastoid muscle; More reference expression data
BioGPS	More reference expression data
Gene ontology
Molecular function	POZ domain binding; protein homodimerization activity; ubiquitin protein ligase activity; ubiquitin-protein transferase activity; protein binding; protein heterodimerization activity; ubiquitin protein ligase binding; cyclin binding; Notch binding
Cellular component	cytoplasm; cullin-RING ubiquitin ligase complex; cytosol; Golgi apparatus; membrane; Cul3-RING ubiquitin ligase complex; nucleoplasm; polar microtubule; extracellular exosome; nucleus; Golgi membrane; cilium; SCF ubiquitin ligase complex; motile cilium; sperm flagellum; cell projection
Biological process	embryonic cleavage; regulation of transcription by RNA polymerase II; G1 phase; negative regulation of Rho protein signal transduction; protein polyubiquitination; in utero embryonic development; negative regulation of transcription by RNA polymerase II; Wnt signaling pathway; protein monoubiquitination; stress fiber assembly; MAPK cascade; positive regulation of cytokinesis; intrinsic apoptotic signaling pathway; endoplasmic reticulum to Golgi vesicle-mediated transport; positive regulation of mitotic metaphase/anaphase transition; COPII vesicle coating; fibroblast apoptotic process; cell projection organization; gastrulation; stem cell division; protein ubiquitination; cell morphogenesis; positive regulation of cell population proliferation; mitotic cell cycle; integrin-mediated signaling pathway; mitotic metaphase plate congression; cell migration; negative regulation of canonical Wnt signaling pathway; vesicle-mediated transport; liver morphogenesis; proteasome-mediated ubiquitin-dependent protein catabolic process; trophectodermal cellular morphogenesis; ubiquitin-dependent protein catabolic process; anaphase-promoting complex-dependent catabolic process; nuclear protein quality control by the ubiquitin-proteasome system; post-translational protein modification; transport; G1/S transition of mitotic cell cycle; SCF-dependent proteasomal ubiquitin-dependent protein catabolic process; positive regulation of protein ubiquitination; protein destabilization
Sources:Amigo / QuickGO
Orthologs
Databases	NCBI: entry; OMA: entry
Species	Human	Mouse
Entrez	8452	26554
Ensembl	ENSG00000036257	ENSMUSG00000004364
UniProt	Q13618	Q9JLV5
RefSeq (mRNA)	NM_001257197; NM_001257198; NM_003590	NM_016716; NM_001313728
RefSeq (protein)	NP_001244126; NP_001244127; NP_003581	NP_001300657; NP_057925
Location (UCSC)	Chr 2: 224.47 – 224.59 Mb	Chr 1: 80.24 – 80.32 Mb
PubMed search
- Wikidata
View/Edit Human	View/Edit Mouse

Cullin-3 is a protein that in humans is encoded by the CUL3 gene.

Cullin 3 protein belongs to the family of cullins which in mammals contains eight proteins (Cullin 1, Cullin 2, Cullin 3, Cullin 4A, Cullin 4B, Cullin 5, Cullin 7 and Cullin 9). Cullin proteins are an evolutionarily conserved family of proteins throughout yeast, plants and mammals.

== Function ==
Cullin 3 is a component of Cullin-RING E3 ubiquitin ligases complexes (CRLs) which are involved in protein ubiquitylation and represent a part of ubiquitin–proteasome system (UPS). Added ubiquitin moieties to the lysine residue by CRLs then target the protein for proteasomal degradation. Cullin-RING E3 ubiquitin ligases are involved in many cellular processes responsible for cell cycle regulation, stress response, protein trafficking, signal transduction, DNA replication, transcription, protein quality control, circadian clock and development.

Deletion of CUL3 gene in mice causes embryonic lethality.

=== Cullin 3-RING E3 ubiquitin ligases ===
Cullin 3-RING complex consists of Cullin 3 protein, RING-box protein 1 (RBX1), which recruits the ubiquitin-conjugating enzyme (E2), and a Bric-a-brac/Tramtrack/Broad (BTB) protein, a substrate recognition subunit. Cullin 3 protein is a core scaffold protein coordinating other components of the CRL complex. Cullin 3-RING complexes can also dimerise via their BTB domains which lead to creation of two substrate receptors and two catalytic RING domains.

Activation of the complex is regulated by the attachment of the ubiquitin-like protein NEDD8 to a conserved Lys residue in the cullin-homology domain, the process called neddylation. Deneddylation is conducted by an eight-subunit CSN complex which mediates the cleavage of the isopeptidic bond between NEDD8 and cullin protein. Another protein that interacts with cullin is CAND1 which binds to deneddylated form of cullin protein and disrupts the interaction between cullin and other subunits of the complex leading to inhibition of the E3 ubiquitin ligase activity. Therefore, dynamic neddylation and deneddylation of cullin is important for regulation of CRL complex activity.

== Clinical significance ==
=== Familial hyperkalemic hypertension ===
Mutations in CUL3 gene are associated with Familial hyperkalemic hypertension disease. CRL complex containing Cullin 3 controls the activity of Na^{+} Cl^{−} cotransporter (NCC) in the kidney by regulating the proteasomal degradation of With-no-lysine [K] kinases WNK1 and WNK4. It was shown that mutations in CUL3 gene lead to WNKs accumulation. The abundance of these kinases leads to increased phosphorylation of NCC and its activation. As a consequence, Na^{+} reabsorption is increasing resulting in high blood pressure.

=== Neurodevelopmental Disorders ===
Cullin 3 is heavily involved in the regulation of the central nervous system. Cullin 3 expression levels in the central nervous system change during fetal development, infancy, childhood and adulthood suggesting that the protein's expression plays a crucial role in brain development. The CUL3 gene has been identified as a risk gene for neurodevelopmental disorders particularly Autism Spectrum Disorder.

=== Cancer ===
Deregulation of Cullin 3 expression level was observed in human cancers. It was shown that Cullin 3 is overexpressed in invasive cancers, and the protein expression level positively correlates with tumour stage. In breast cancer, the overexpression of Cullin 3 protein results in a decrease of Nrf2 protein level. This protein is a transcription factor regulating the expression of some detoxification and antioxidant enzymes. Another substrate of CRL complex is a candidate tumour suppressor protein RhoBTB2.

== Interactions ==
CUL3 has been shown to interact with:

- CAND1,
- Cyclin E1,
- DCUN1D1,
- KEAP1, and
- KLHL12.
