= Calmodulin binding domain =

Protein domain

CaMBD
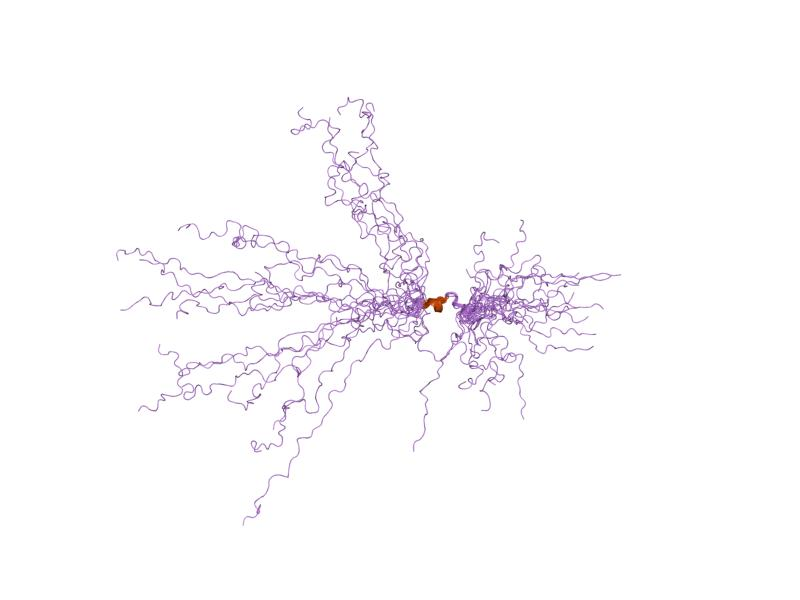
- solution structure of the calmodulin binding domain (cambd) of small conductanceCa^{2+}-activated potassium channels (sk2)

Identifiers
- Symbol: CaMBD
- Pfam: PF02888
- InterPro: IPR004178
- SCOP2: 1kkd / SCOPe / SUPFAM
Available protein structures:
- PDB: IPR004178 PF02888 (ECOD; PDBsum)
- AlphaFold: IPR004178; PF02888

In molecular biology, calmodulin binding domain (CaMBD) is a protein domain found in small-conductance calcium-activated potassium channels (SK channels). These channels are independent of voltage and gated solely by intracellular Ca^{2+}. They are heteromeric complexes that comprise pore-forming alpha-subunits and the Ca^{2+}-binding protein calmodulin (CaM). CaM binds to the SK channel through the CaMBD, which is located in an intracellular region of the alpha-subunit immediately carboxy-terminal to the pore. Channel opening is triggered when Ca^{2+} binds the EF hands in the N-lobe of CaM. The structure of this domain complexed with CaM is known. This domain forms an elongated dimer with a CaM molecule bound at each end; each CaM wraps around three alpha-helices, two from one CaMBD subunit and one from the other.
