= Pseudohypoaldosteronism =

Pseudohypoaldosteronism (PHA) is a condition that mimics hypoaldosteronism (presenting hyperkalemia). Two major types of primary pseudohypoaldosteronism are recognized and these have major differences in etiology and presentation.

== Pseudohypoaldosteronism type 1 (PHA1) ==
Pseudohypoaldosteronism Type 1
- In pseudohypoaldosteronism type 1, aldosterone is elevated (hyperaldosteronism), but because the body fails to respond to it, it appears similar to hypoaldosteronism.
- Specialty: Nephrology
- Symptoms: Failure to thrive, dehydration, hyponatremia, metabolic acidosis, hyperkalemia, and other non-specific symptoms including nausea, vomiting, extreme fatigue, and muscle weakness.
- Causes: Mutations in the NR3C2, SCNN1A, SCNN1B, or SCNN1G genes

Pseudohypoaldosteronism type 1 (PHA1) is characterized by the body's inability to respond adequately to aldosterone, a hormone crucial for regulating electrolyte levels. This condition often manifests with dehydration as the kidneys struggle to retain sufficient salt, leading to symptoms like increased thirst and dry mouth. Additionally, PHA1 disrupts electrolyte balance, resulting in low levels of sodium and high levels of potassium in the blood.

=== Mechanism ===
PHA1 is an heterogeneous disease, which can be caused by mutations in different genes. On one hand, mutations on the gene NR3C2 (coding the mineralocorticoid receptor) cause the synthesis of a non-functional receptor which is unable to bind aldosterone or function correctly. In the kidney, aldosterone plays an important role of regulating sodium and potassium homeostasis by its actions on distal nephron cells.

On the other hand, autosomal recessive PHA1 is caused by mutations in both alleles of either SCNN1A, SCNN1B or SCNN1G. These genes code the different subunits of the epithelial sodium channel, ENaC, which is located in the collecting duct of the nephron, and is responsible for sodium reabsorption and potassium secretion (by generating the electrochemical gradient necessary for potassium efflux by ROMK channel).

=== Types ===
Type	OMIM	Gene	Inheritance	Age of Onset	Description
PHA1A	177735	NR3C2 (Mineralocorticoid receptor, MLR)	Autosomal dominant	Neonatal but improves with age. Adults are usually asymptomatic without treatment.	Salt wasting caused by renal unresponsiveness to mineralocorticoids. Patients often present with hyperkalaemic acidosis despite high aldosterone levels. Not all individuals with the mutation develop PHA1A, suggesting that illness and volume depletion may play a role in the development of the clinically recognized PHA1A.
PHA1B	264350	SCNN1A, SCNN1B, SCNN1G (encoding epithelial sodium channel subunits)	Autosomal recessive	Neonatal, persists into adulthood.	Renal salt wasting and high concentrations of sodium in sweat, stool, and saliva. The disorder often involves multiple organ systems and can be life-threatening in the neonatal period. Patients usually present with hyponatremia, hyperkalemia, and increased plasma renin activity with high serum aldosterone concentrations. PHA1B is often mistaken for cystic fibrosis.

=== Treatment ===
Treatment of severe forms of PHA1 requires relatively large amounts of sodium chloride. Potassium restriction in the diet might also contribute to decrease urinary sodium wasting.

=== Risks ===
Individuals with PHA1B can have additional symptoms such as cardiac arrhythmia, shock, recurrent lung infections, or lesions on the skin due to imbalanced salts in the body especially in infancy.

A stop mutation in the SCNN1A gene has been shown to be associated with female infertility.

== Pseudohypoaldosteronism type 2 (PHA2) ==
PHA2, also known as familial hyperkalemic hypertension or Gordon syndrome, is a rare disorder characterized by abnormalities in how the body regulates sodium and potassium levels. This condition stems from mutations in specific genes involved in the regulation of sodium transport within the kidneys.

Unlike in PHA1 in which aldosterone resistance is present, in PHA2 blood volume increases occur regardless of normal or low aldosterone levels due to the enhanced activity of sodium transporters in the kidney.

=== Mechanism ===
PHA2 is associated with mutations in the WNK4, WNK1, KLHL3 and CUL3 genes. These genes regulate the sodium-chloride symporter (NCC) transporter, which is involved in controlling the levels of sodium and chloride in the body. Normally, the NCC transporter reabsorbs sodium and chloride in a part of the kidney called the distal convoluted tubule (DCT), however in PHA2 this process is dysregulated. Mutations in these genes lead to overactivity of NCC, causing excessive sodium and chloride reabsorption.

The hyperkalemia found in PHA2 is proposed to be a function of diminished sodium delivery to the cortical collecting tubule (potassium excretion is mediated by the renal outer medullary potassium channel (ROMK) in which sodium reabsorption plays a role). Alternatively, WNK4 mutations that result in a gain of function of the Na-Cl co-transporter may inhibit ROMK activity resulting in hyperkalemia.

=== Onset ===
The age of onset is difficult to pinpoint and can range from infancy to adulthood.

=== Symptoms ===
People with PHA2 have hypertension and hyperkalemia despite having normal kidney function. Many individuals with PHA2 will develop hyperkalemia first, and will not present with hypertension until later in life. They also commonly experience both hyperchloremia and metabolic acidosis together, a condition called hyperchloremic metabolic acidosis.

People with PHA2 may experience other nonspecific symptoms including nausea, vomiting, extreme fatigue, muscle weakness, and hypercalcuria.

Some PHA2E patients present with dental abnormalities. Patients with recessive KLHL3 mutations and dominant CUL3 mutations tend to have more severe phenotypes.

A study in 2024 linked PHA2 to epilepsy. Epileptic seizures were seen in 3 of the 44 affected subjects. Two of the subjects had generalized tonic–clonic seizure and one subject had migraine seizures. All three subjects had WNK4 mutations. It is speculated that the epilepsy may be caused by potassium spikes resulting in abnormal CNS neuron activity. The study also linked PHA2 to proximal renal tubular acidosis. Metabolic acidosis is also known to cause epileptic seizures.

=== Types ===
Type	OMIM	Gene	Inheritance	Age Of Onset	Description
PHA2A	145260	mapped to chromosome 1q31-q42	Autosomal dominant	Varies	Does not involve salt wasting.
PHA2B	614491	WNK4	Autosomal dominant	10+ with a mean age of 28	May involve salt wasting. Patients typically do not experience hypertension until adulthood. Bicarbonate is higher than other PHA2 types. Aldosterone concentrations are often normal. TRPV6 may be involved.
PHA2C	614492	WNK1	Autosomal dominant	15+ with a mean age of 36	Does not involve salt wasting. Significantly less severely affected than other PHA2 types. Affected patients have hypertension together with long-term hyperkalemia, hyperchloremia, normal plasma creatinine, reduced bicarbonate, and low renin levels. Aldestrone levels may be normal or elevated.
PHA2D	614495	KLHL3	Autosomal dominant or autosomal recessive	Mean age at diagnosis was found to be around 24 to 26, but it varies widely.	May involve salt wasting. Individuals with the autosomal dominant mutations typically show higher potassium levels than those with autosomal recessive mutations. Hypertension usually develops in adulthood. Patients often present with low bicarbonate (17–18).
PHA2E	614496	CUL3	Autosomal dominant	3–15 years old	Most severe manifestations of PHA2 compared to patients with other mutations. Almost all individuals present with hypertension before age 18.

=== Treatment ===
PHA2 requires salt restriction and use of thiazide diuretics to block sodium chloride reabsorption and normalise blood pressure and serum potassium.

=== Risks ===
==== Pregnancy risks ====
As of 2018, at least seven reported cases of severe metabolic acidosis occurring during pregnancy have been reported in PHA2 patients.

A study in 2023 also described a patient with severe preeclampsia later being diagnosed with PHA2D associated with chronic hyperkalemia and hyperchloremic metabolic acidosis. The twin babies were born healthy and discharged from the hospital.

==== Other risks ====
One study noted that severe hypercalciuria from untreated PHA2 resulted in kidney stones, and osteoporosis in some patients.

== History ==
PHA1 was first described by Cheek and Perry in 1958. Later pediatric endocrinologist Aaron Hanukoglu reported that there are two independent forms of PHA with different inheritance patterns: A renal form with autosomal dominant inheritance exhibiting salt loss mainly from the kidneys, and a multi-system form with autosomal recessive form exhibiting salt loss from kidney, lung, and sweat and salivary glands.

The hereditary lack of responsiveness to aldosterone could be due to at least two possibilities: 1. A mutation in the mineralocorticoid receptor that binds aldosterone, or 2. A mutation in a gene that is regulated by aldosterone. Linkage analysis on patients with the severe form of PHA excluded the possibility of linkage of the disease with the mineralocorticoid receptor gene region. Later, the severe form of PHA was discovered to be due to mutations in the genes SCNN1A, SCNN1B, and SCNN1G that code for the epithelial sodium channel subunits, α, β, and γ, respectively.

On the other hand, PHA2 was initially described by Richard Gordon. Mutations in WNK1 and WNK4 as a cause for PHA2 were first described in 2001 by Richard Lifton´s laboratory. Later, mutations in KLHL3 and CUL3 were also found in different PHA2 patients in 2012.

== See also ==
- Hyperchloremic acidosis
- Pseudohyperaldosteronism
