= WNK2 =

Protein-coding gene in the species Homo sapiens

Identifiers
- Aliases: WNK2, NY-CO-43, P/OKcl.13, PRKSDCCAG43, WNK lysine deficient protein kinase 2
- External IDs: OMIM: 606249; MGI: 1922857; GeneCards: WNK2
Enzyme activity
EC #	BRENDA	ExPASy	KEGG	MetaCyc
2.7.11.1	↗	↗	↗	↗

Gene location (Human)
Chr.	Chromosome 9 (human)
Band	9q22.31	Start	93,184,122 bp
Band	9q22.31	End	93,320,572 bp

Gene location (Mouse)
Chr.	Chromosome 13 (mouse)
Band	13 A5|13 25.07 cM	Start	49,189,779 bp
Band	13 A5|13 25.07 cM	End	49,301,490 bp
RNA expression pattern
Bgee	Human / Mouse (ortholog); Top expressed in: apex of heart; right uterine tube; right auricle of heart; right hemisphere of cerebellum; body of pancreas; transverse colon; anterior pituitary; ganglionic eminence; left ventricle; muscle layer of sigmoid colon / Top expressed in: muscle of thigh; superior frontal gyrus; primary visual cortex; cerebellar cortex; dentate gyrus of hippocampal formation granule cell; secondary oocyte; skeletal muscle tissue; lacrimal gland; Rostral migratory stream; triceps brachii muscle; More reference expression data
BioGPS	n/a
Gene ontology
Molecular function	transferase activity; nucleotide binding; protein kinase activity; ATP binding; kinase activity; protein serine/threonine kinase activity; chloride channel inhibitor activity; potassium channel inhibitor activity
Cellular component	cytoplasm; plasma membrane; membrane; cytosol
Biological process	negative regulation of ERK1 and ERK2 cascade; protein autophosphorylation; protein phosphorylation; positive regulation of sodium ion transmembrane transporter activity; intracellular signal transduction; phosphorylation; negative regulation of cell population proliferation; positive regulation of canonical Wnt signaling pathway; ion homeostasis; negative regulation of sodium ion transport; positive regulation of ion transmembrane transporter activity; positive regulation of potassium ion import across plasma membrane
Sources:Amigo / QuickGO
Orthologs
Databases	NCBI: entry; OMA: entry
Species	Human	Mouse
Entrez	65268	75607
Ensembl	ENSG00000165238	ENSMUSG00000037989
UniProt	Q9Y3S1	Q3UH66
RefSeq (mRNA)	NM_001282394; NM_006648	NM_001290311; NM_001290313; NM_029361
RefSeq (protein)	NP_001269323; NP_006639	NP_001277240; NP_001277242; NP_083637
Location (UCSC)	Chr 9: 93.18 – 93.32 Mb	Chr 13: 49.19 – 49.3 Mb
PubMed search
- Wikidata
View/Edit Human	View/Edit Mouse

Serine/threonine-protein kinase WNK2 is an enzyme that in humans is encoded by the WNK2 gene.

The protein encoded by this gene is a cytoplasmic serine-threonine kinase that contains cysteine in place of the lysine found at the conserved ATP-binding location in subdomain II of protein kinases. Since this protein does have kinase activity, it is possible that another lysine in the kinase subdomain I can substitute for the missing conserved lysine.
