= Kelch-like protein 3 =

Protein-coding gene in the species Homo sapiens

KLHL3

Identifiers
- Aliases: KLHL3, PHA2D, kelch like family member 3
- External IDs: OMIM: 605775; MGI: 2445185; GeneCards: KLHL3
Available structures
PDB	Ortholog search: PDBe RCSB
PDB	List of PDB id codes 4CH9, 4HXI

Gene location (Human)
Chr.	Chromosome 5 (human)
Band	5q31.2	Start	137,617,500 bp
Band	5q31.2	End	137,736,089 bp

Gene location (Mouse)
Chr.	Chromosome 13 (mouse)
Band	13|13 B1	Start	58,148,042 bp
Band	13|13 B1	End	58,261,406 bp
RNA expression pattern
Bgee	Human / Mouse (ortholog); Top expressed in: cerebellar vermis; middle temporal gyrus; cerebellar hemisphere; right hemisphere of cerebellum; cardiac muscle tissue of right atrium; Brodmann area 23; Brodmann area 46; sural nerve; Region I of hippocampus proper; inferior olivary nucleus / Top expressed in: dentate gyrus of hippocampal formation granule cell; neural layer of retina; hippocampus proper; primary visual cortex; human kidney; superior frontal gyrus; olfactory bulb; cerebellum; striatum of neuraxis; cerebellar cortex; More reference expression data
BioGPS	n/a
Gene ontology
Molecular function	actin binding; protein binding; structural molecule activity; ubiquitin-protein transferase activity
Cellular component	cytoplasm; cytoskeleton; Cul3-RING ubiquitin ligase complex; cytosol
Biological process	protein K48-linked ubiquitination; distal tubule morphogenesis; renal sodium ion absorption; protein ubiquitination; ion homeostasis; post-translational protein modification; ubiquitin-dependent protein catabolic process; selective autophagy
Sources:Amigo / QuickGO
Orthologs
Databases	NCBI: entry; OMA: entry
Species	Human	Mouse
Entrez	26249	100503085
Ensembl	ENSG00000146021	ENSMUSG00000014164
UniProt	Q9UH77	E0CZ16
RefSeq (mRNA)	NM_017415; NM_001257194; NM_001257195	NM_001195075; NM_001362415; NM_001368867; NM_001368868
RefSeq (protein)	NP_001244123; NP_001244124; NP_059111	NP_001349344; NP_001355796; NP_001355797
Location (UCSC)	Chr 5: 137.62 – 137.74 Mb	Chr 13: 58.15 – 58.26 Mb
PubMed search
- Wikidata
View/Edit Human	View/Edit Mouse

Kelch-like protein 3 is a protein in humans that is encoded by the KLHL3 gene. Alternative splicing results in multiple transcript variants encoding distinct isoforms.

== Function ==
This gene is ubiquitously expressed and encodes a full-length protein which has an N-terminal BTB domain followed by a BACK domain and six kelch-like repeats in the C-terminus. These kelch-like repeats promote substrate ubiquitination of bound proteins via interaction of the BTB domain with the CUL3 (cullin 3) component of a cullin-RING E3 ubiquitin ligase (CRL) complex.

== Clinical significance ==
=== Pseudohypoaldosteronism Type 2D ===
Mutations in this gene cause pseudohypoaldosteronism type IID (PHA2D); a rare Mendelian syndrome featuring hypertension, hyperkalaemia and metabolic acidosis.

=== Ischemic Stroke ===
A machine learning model identified the KLHL3 gene as a key gene in the occurrence and progression of ischemic stroke.
