= Distal convoluted tubule =

Feature of kidney anatomy

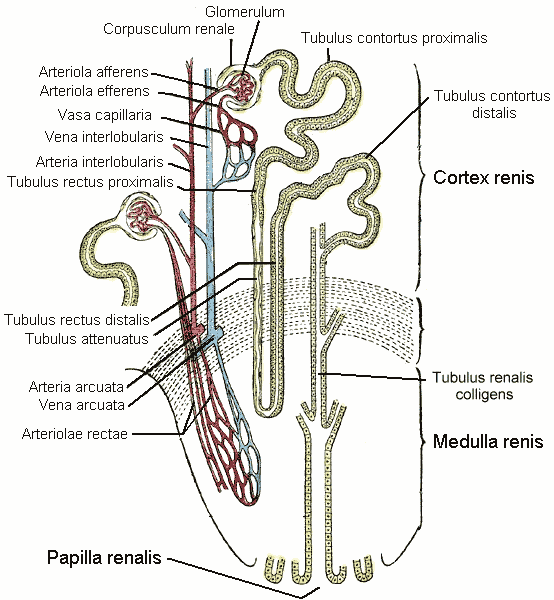
- Kidney nephron ("1st proximal convoluted tubule", "2nd distal convoluted tubule")

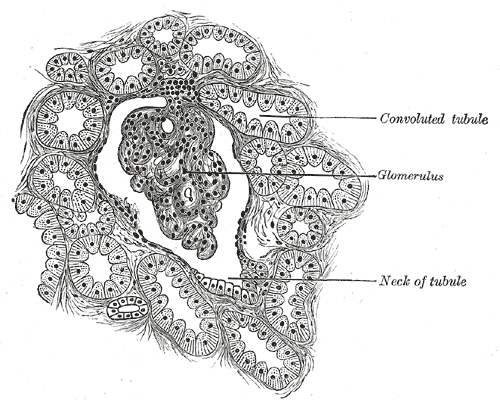
- Section of cortex of human kidney.

Details
- Precursor: Metanephrogenic blastema

Identifiers
- Latin: tubulus contortus distalis
- FMA: 17721

The distal convoluted tubule (DCT) is a portion of kidney nephron between the loop of Henle and the collecting tubule.

== Physiology ==
It is partly responsible for the regulation of potassium, sodium, calcium, and pH.

On its apical surface (lumen side), cells of the DCT have a thiazide-sensitive Na-Cl cotransporter and are permeable to Ca, via the TRPV5 channel. On the basolateral surface (peritubular capillary side) there is an ATP-dependent Na/K antiporter pump, a secondary active Na/Ca transporter, and an ATP dependent Ca transporter. The basolateral ATP dependent Na/K pump produces the gradient for Na to be absorbed from the apical surface via the Na/Cl symporter, and for Ca to be reclaimed into the blood by the Na/Ca basolateral antiporter.

- It regulates pH by absorbing bicarbonate and secreting protons (H^{+}) into the filtrate, or by absorbing protons and secreting bicarbonate into the filtrate.
- Sodium and potassium levels are controlled by secreting K^{+} and absorbing Na^{+}. Sodium absorption by the distal tubule is mediated by the hormone aldosterone. Aldosterone increases sodium reabsorption. Sodium and chloride (salt) reabsorption is also mediated by a group of kinases called WNK kinases. There are 4 different WNK kinases, WNK1, WNK2, WNK3, and WNK4.
- It also participates in calcium regulation by reabsorbing Ca^{2+} in response to parathyroid hormone. PTH effect is mediated through phosphorylation of regulatory proteins and enhancing the synthesis of all transporters within the distal convoluted tubule.
- Arginine vasopressin receptor 2 is also expressed in the DCT.

== Clinical significance ==
Thiazide diuretics inhibit Na^{+}/Cl^{−} reabsorption from the DCT by blocking the thiazide-sensitive Na-Cl cotransporter.

By inhibiting the transporter, thiazide diuretics increase the gradient potential for Na. This increases the activity of the basolateral Na/Ca antiport and causes the increase in calcium reclamation associated with thiazide diuretics.

== Histology ==
The DCT is lined with simple cuboidal cells, the distal convoluted tubule cells, that are shorter than those of the proximal convoluted tubule (PCT). The lumen appears larger in the PCT than the DCT lumen because the PCT has a brush border (microvilli). DCT can be recognized by its numerous mitochondria (even though it is not as much as PCT), basal enfoldings and lateral membrane interdigitations with neighboring cells.

The point where DCT contacts the cortical thick ascending limb of the loop of Henle is called macula densa. It has tightly packed columnar cells which display reversed polarity and may monitor the osmolarity of blood.

Histologically, cells of the DCT can be differentiated from cells of the proximal convoluted tubule:

Characteristic	PCT	DCT
Apical brush border	Usually present	Not present
Eosinophilicity	More	Less
Cytoplasm	More	Less
Readily discernible nuclei	Less likely	More likely

== Additional images ==
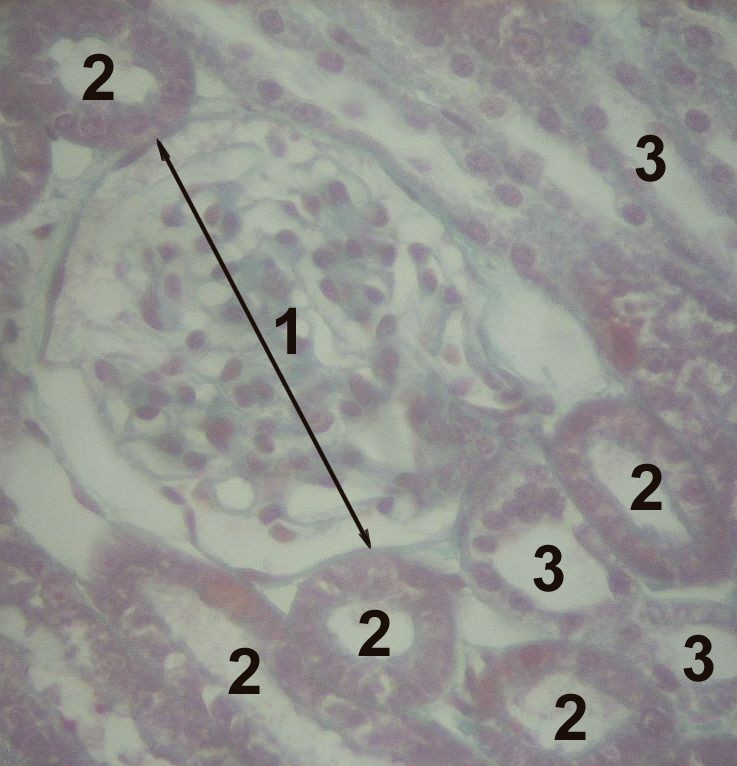
1 Glomerulus, 2 proximal tubule, 3 distal tubule

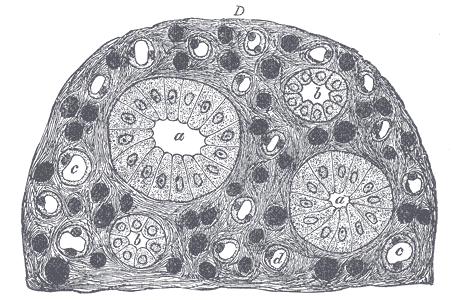
Transverse section of pyramidal substance of kidney of pig, the bloodvessels of which are injected.

Renal corpuscle

Diagram outlining movement of ions in nephron.

== See also ==
List of distinct cell types in the adult human body
