= WNK3 =

Protein-coding gene in the species Homo sapiens

Identifiers
- Aliases: WNK3, PRKWNK lysine deficient protein kinase 3
- External IDs: OMIM: 300358; MGI: 2652875; GeneCards: WNK3
Enzyme activity
EC #	BRENDA	ExPASy	KEGG	MetaCyc
2.7.11.1	↗	↗	↗	↗

Gene location (Human)
Chr.	X chromosome (human)
Band	Xp11.22	Start	54,192,823 bp
Band	Xp11.22	End	54,358,642 bp

Gene location (Mouse)
Chr.	X chromosome (mouse)
Band	X|X F3	Start	149,981,074 bp
Band	X|X F3	End	150,103,148 bp
RNA expression pattern
Bgee	Human / Mouse (ortholog); Top expressed in: corpus epididymis; buccal mucosa cell; tail of epididymis; testicle; gonad; caput epididymis; secondary oocyte; seminal vesicula; internal globus pallidus; retinal pigment epithelium / Top expressed in: hand; lateral hypothalamus; lumbar subsegment of spinal cord; ventromedial nucleus; paraventricular nucleus of hypothalamus; dorsomedial hypothalamic nucleus; anterior amygdaloid area; tail of embryo; mammillary body; lateral septal nucleus; More reference expression data
BioGPS	n/a
Gene ontology
Molecular function	transferase activity; protein kinase activity; nucleotide binding; kinase activity; protein serine/threonine kinase activity; protein binding; chloride channel inhibitor activity; ATP binding; potassium channel inhibitor activity
Cellular component	cytoplasm; bicellular tight junction; adherens junction; cytosol
Biological process	phosphorylation; negative regulation of apoptotic process; protein phosphorylation; positive regulation of ion transmembrane transporter activity; positive regulation of peptidyl-threonine phosphorylation; positive regulation of sodium ion transport; protein autophosphorylation; positive regulation of sodium ion transmembrane transporter activity; negative regulation of pancreatic juice secretion; positive regulation of calcium ion transport; intracellular signal transduction; regulation of calcium ion import; protein localization to plasma membrane; positive regulation of protein localization to plasma membrane; ion homeostasis; negative regulation of sodium ion transport; positive regulation of potassium ion import across plasma membrane
Sources:Amigo / QuickGO
Orthologs
Databases	NCBI: entry; OMA: entry
Species	Human	Mouse
Entrez	65267	279561
Ensembl	ENSG00000196632	ENSMUSG00000041245
UniProt	Q9BYP7	Q80XP9
RefSeq (mRNA)	NM_001002838; NM_020922; NM_001395166	NM_001271678; NM_001271679
RefSeq (protein)	NP_001002838; NP_065973	NP_001258607; NP_001258608
Location (UCSC)	Chr X: 54.19 – 54.36 Mb	Chr X: 149.98 – 150.1 Mb
PubMed search
- Wikidata
View/Edit Human	View/Edit Mouse

Serine/threonine-protein kinase WNK3, also known as protein kinase lysine-deficient 3, is a protein that in humans is encoded by the WNK3 gene.

== Function ==
WNK3 is a protein belonging to the 'with no lysine' family of serine-threonine protein kinases. These family members lack the catalytic lysine in subdomain II, and instead have a conserved lysine in subdomain I. This family member functions as a positive regulator of the transcellular Ca^{2+} transport pathway, and it plays a role in the increase of cell survival in a caspase 3 dependent pathway.
