= Sodium zirconium cyclosilicate =

Medication used to treat high blood potassium

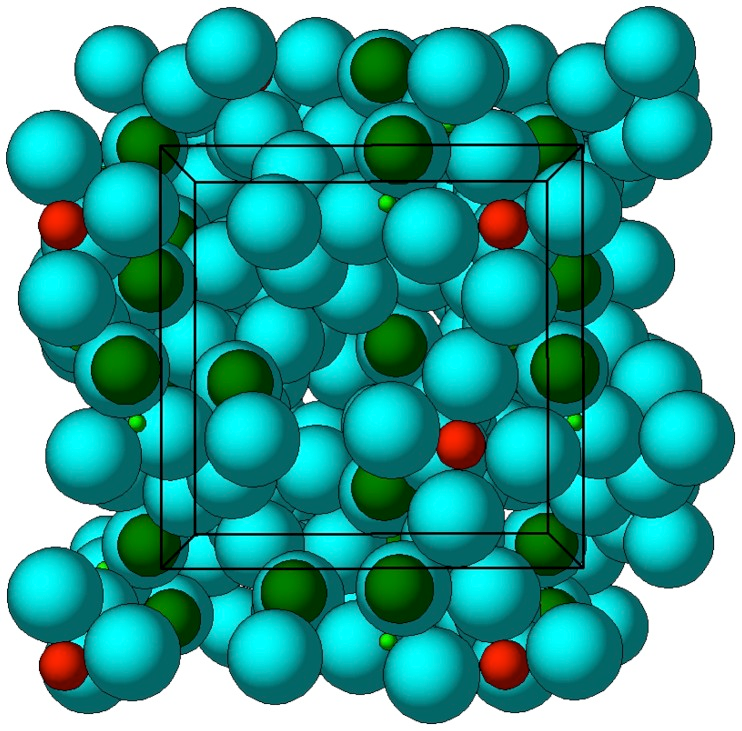
- Crystal structure of ZS-9. Blue spheres = oxygen atoms, red spheres = zirconium atoms, green spheres = silicon atoms.

Clinical data
- Trade names: Lokelma
- Other names: ZS-9
- AHFS/Drugs.com: Monograph
- MedlinePlus: a618035
- License data: US DailyMed: Sodium zirconium cyclosilicate
- Pregnancy category: AU: B1
- Routes of administration: By mouth
- ATC code: V03AE10 (WHO)

Legal status
- Legal status: AU: S4 (Prescription only); CA: ℞-only; US: ℞-only; EU: Rx-only; In general: ℞ (Prescription only)

Pharmacokinetic data
- Bioavailability: Not absorbed
- Excretion: Feces

Identifiers
- IUPAC name: Silicic acid, sodium zirconium(4+) salt (3:2:1), hydrate
- CAS Number: 17141-74-1
- DrugBank: DB14048
- UNII: D652ZWF066
- KEGG: D10727

Chemical and physical data
- Formula: (2Na·H_{2}O·3H_{4}SiO_{4}·H_{4}ZrO_{6})_{n}

Sodium zirconium cyclosilicate, often abbreviated to SZC and sold under the brand name Lokelma, is a medication used to treat high blood potassium. Onset of effects occurs in one to six hours. It is taken by mouth.

Common side effects include swelling and low blood potassium. Use is likely safe in pregnancy and breastfeeding. It works by binding potassium ions in the gastrointestinal tract which is then lost in the stool.

Sodium zirconium cyclosilicate was approved for medical use in the European Union and in the United States in 2018. It was developed by AstraZeneca.

== Medical use ==
Sodium zirconium cyclosilicate is used to treat high blood potassium. Onset of effects occurs in one to six hours.

== Mechanism of action ==
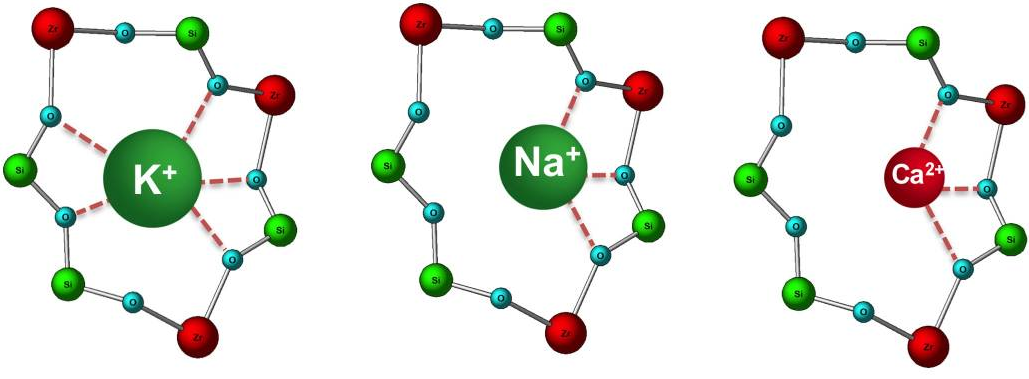
Cross-sections of ZS-9 pores with three different ions (K⁺ = potassium, Na⁺ = sodium, Ca²⁺ = calcium). The specificity for potassium is thought to be caused by the diameter and composition of the pores, which resembles potassium channels.

ZS-9 is a zirconium silicate. Zirconium silicates have been extensively used in medical applications because of their proven safety. 11 zirconium silicates were screened by an iterative optimization process. ZS-9 selectively captures potassium ions, presumably by mimicking the actions of physiologic potassium channels. ZS-9 is an inorganic cation exchanger crystalline with a high capacity to entrap monovalent cations, specifically potassium and ammonium ions, in the GI tract. ZS-9 is one of the least potent pharmaceuticals; the typical dose is 10g.

=== Background ===
Hyperkalemia is rare among those who are otherwise healthy. Among those who are in hospital, rates are between 1% and 2.5%. Common causes include kidney failure, hypoaldosteronism, and rhabdomyolysis. A number of medications can also cause high blood potassium including spironolactone, NSAIDs, and angiotensin converting enzyme inhibitors.

There is no universally accepted definition of what level of hyperkalemia is mild, moderate, or severe. However, if hyperkalemia causes any ECG change it is considered a medical emergency due to a risk of potentially fatal abnormal heart rhythms and is treated urgently. Potassium levels greater than 6.5 to 7.0 mmol/L in the absence of ECG changes are managed aggressively. Several approaches are used to treat hyperkalemia. Other approved potassium binders in the United States include patiromer and sodium polystyrene sulfonate.

Hyperkalemia, particularly if severe, is a marker for an increased risk of death. However, there is disagreement regarding whether a modestly elevated levels directly causes problems. One viewpoint is that mild to moderate hyperkalemia is a secondary effect that denotes underlying medical problems. Accordingly, these problems are both proximate and ultimate causes of death,

== History ==
In the United States, regulatory approval of ZS-9 was rejected by the Food and Drug Administration (FDA) in May 2016, due to issues associated with manufacturing. On 18 May 2018, the FDA approved sodium zirconium cyclosilicate for treatment of adults with hyperkalemia.

It was first practically synthesized by UOP in the late 1990s. The recognition of the unique ion exchange properties and the potential use to remove toxins from the body were identified shortly thereafter.

== Research ==
One review found a decrease in potassium of 0.17 mEq/L at one hour and 0.67 mEq/L at 48 hours.

It appears effective in people with chronic kidney disease, diabetes, and heart failure. Use has been studied for up to a year.
