= ATC code V03 =

ATC code V03 All other therapeutic products is a therapeutic subgroup of the Anatomical Therapeutic Chemical Classification System, a system of alphanumeric codes developed by the World Health Organization (WHO) for the classification of drugs and other medical products. Subgroup V03 is part of the anatomical group V Various.

Codes for veterinary use (ATCvet codes) can be created by placing the letter Q in front of the human ATC code: for example, QV03. ATCvet codes without corresponding human ATC codes are cited with the leading Q in the following list.
National versions of the ATC classification may include additional codes not present in this list, which follows the WHO version.

== V03A All other therapeutic products ==
=== V03AB Antidotes ===
V03AB01 Ipecacuanha
V03AB02 Nalorphine
V03AB03 Edetates
V03AB04 Pralidoxime
V03AB05 Prednisolone and promethazine
V03AB06 Thiosulfate
V03AB08 Sodium nitrite
V03AB09 Dimercaprol
V03AB13 Obidoxime
V03AB14 Protamine
V03AB15 Naloxone
V03AB16 Ethanol
V03AB17 Methylthioninium chloride
V03AB18 Potassium permanganate
V03AB19 Physostigmine
V03AB20 Copper sulfate
V03AB21 Potassium iodide
V03AB22 Amyl nitrite
V03AB23 Acetylcysteine
V03AB24 Digitalis antitoxin
V03AB25 Flumazenil
V03AB26 Methionine
V03AB27 4-dimethylaminophenol
V03AB29 Cholinesterase
V03AB31 Prussian blue
V03AB32 Glutathione
V03AB33 Hydroxocobalamin
V03AB34 Fomepizole
V03AB35 Sugammadex
V03AB36 Phentolamine
V03AB37 Idarucizumab
V03AB38 Andexanet alfa
V03AB54 Pralidoxime and atropine
QV03AB90 Atipamezole
QV03AB91 Sarmazenil
QV03AB92 Diprenorfin
QV03AB93 Yohimbine
QV03AB94 Tolazoline
QV03AB95 Apomorphine
QV03AB96 Ropinirole

=== V03AC Iron chelating agents ===
V03AC01 Deferoxamine
V03AC02 Deferiprone
V03AC03 Deferasirox

=== V03AE Drugs for treatment of hyperkalemia and hyperphosphatemia ===
V03AE01 Polystyrene sulfonate
V03AE02 Sevelamer
V03AE03 Lanthanum carbonate
V03AE04 Calcium acetate and magnesium carbonate
V03AE05 Sucroferric oxyhydroxide
V03AE06 Colestilan
V03AE07 Calcium acetate
V03AE08 Ferric citrate
V03AE09 Patiromer calcium
V03AE10 Sodium zirconium cyclosilicate

=== V03AF Detoxifying agents for antineoplastic treatment ===
V03AF01 Mesna
V03AF02 Dexrazoxane
V03AF03 Calcium folinate
V03AF04 Calcium levofolinate
V03AF05 Amifostine
V03AF06 Sodium folinate
V03AF07 Rasburicase
V03AF08 Palifermin
V03AF09 Glucarpidase
V03AF10 Sodium levofolinate
V03AF11 Arginine and lysine
V03AF12 Trilaciclib

=== V03AG Drugs for treatment of hypercalcemia ===
V03AG01 Sodium cellulose phosphate
V03AG05 Sodium phosphate

=== V03AH Drugs for treatment of hypoglycaemia ===
V03AH01 Diazoxide

=== V03AN Medical gases ===
V03AN01 Oxygen
V03AN02 Carbon dioxide
V03AN03 Helium
V03AN04 Nitrogen
V03AN05 Medical air

=== V03AX Other therapeutic products ===
V03AX02 Nalfurafine
V03AX03 Cobicistat
V03AX04 Difelikefalin

=== V03AZ Nerve depressants ===
V03AZ01 Ethanol
