= Trans-tubular potassium gradient =

The trans-tubular potassium gradient (TTKG) is an index reflecting the conservation of potassium in the cortical collecting ducts (CCD) of the kidneys. It is useful in diagnosing the causes of hyperkalemia or hypokalemia. The TTKG estimates the ratio of potassium in the lumen of the CCD to that in the peritubular capillaries.

The following is the formula for calculating the TTKG:

$TTKG = {\frac{urine_K}{plasma_K}} \div {\frac{urine_{osm}}{plasma_{osm}}}$

Note that this formula is valid only when U_{osm} >300 and U_{Na} >25

The validity of this measurement falls on three assumptions:

- (1) Few solutes are reabsorbed in the medullary collecting duct (MCD)
- (2) Potassium is neither secreted nor reabsorbed in the MCD
- (3)The osmolality of the fluid in the terminal CCD is known

Significant reabsorption or secretion of K in the MCD seldom occurs, except in profound K depletion or excess, respectively.

A typical TTKG in a normal person on a normal diet is 8-9. During hyperkalemia or high potassium intake, more potassium should be excreted in the urine and the TTKG should be above 10. Low levels (<7) during hyperkalemia may indicate mineralocorticoid deficiency, especially if accompanied by hyponatremia and high urine Na.

During potassium depletion or hypokalemia, the TTKG should fall to less than 3, indicating appropriately reduced urinary excretion of potassium.

== See also ==
- Hyperkalemia
- Hypoaldosteronism
- Aldosterone
- Fractional sodium excretion
