= Polystyrene (disambiguation) =

Polystyrene may refer to:

- Polystyrene, a synthetic material (eg: Styrofoam)
- Polystyrene sulfonate, group of medications that treat blood potassium levels
- Poly Styrene (1957–2011), the stage-name of Marianne Elliott-Said, a Somali-British punk musician
