= Carboxypeptidase G =

Carboxypeptidase G may refer to one of the following:

- Glutamate carboxypeptidase, an enzyme
- Gamma-glutamyl hydrolase, an enzyme
