= Prednisolone/promethazine =

Antidote for snake bites

Combination of
- Prednisolone: Glucocorticoid
- Promethazine: Histamine antagonist

Clinical data
- ATC code: V03AB05 (WHO)

The drug combination prednisolone/promethazine is an antidote for snake bites.
