= Digoxin toxicity =

- Other names: Digoxin poisoning, digoxin overdose
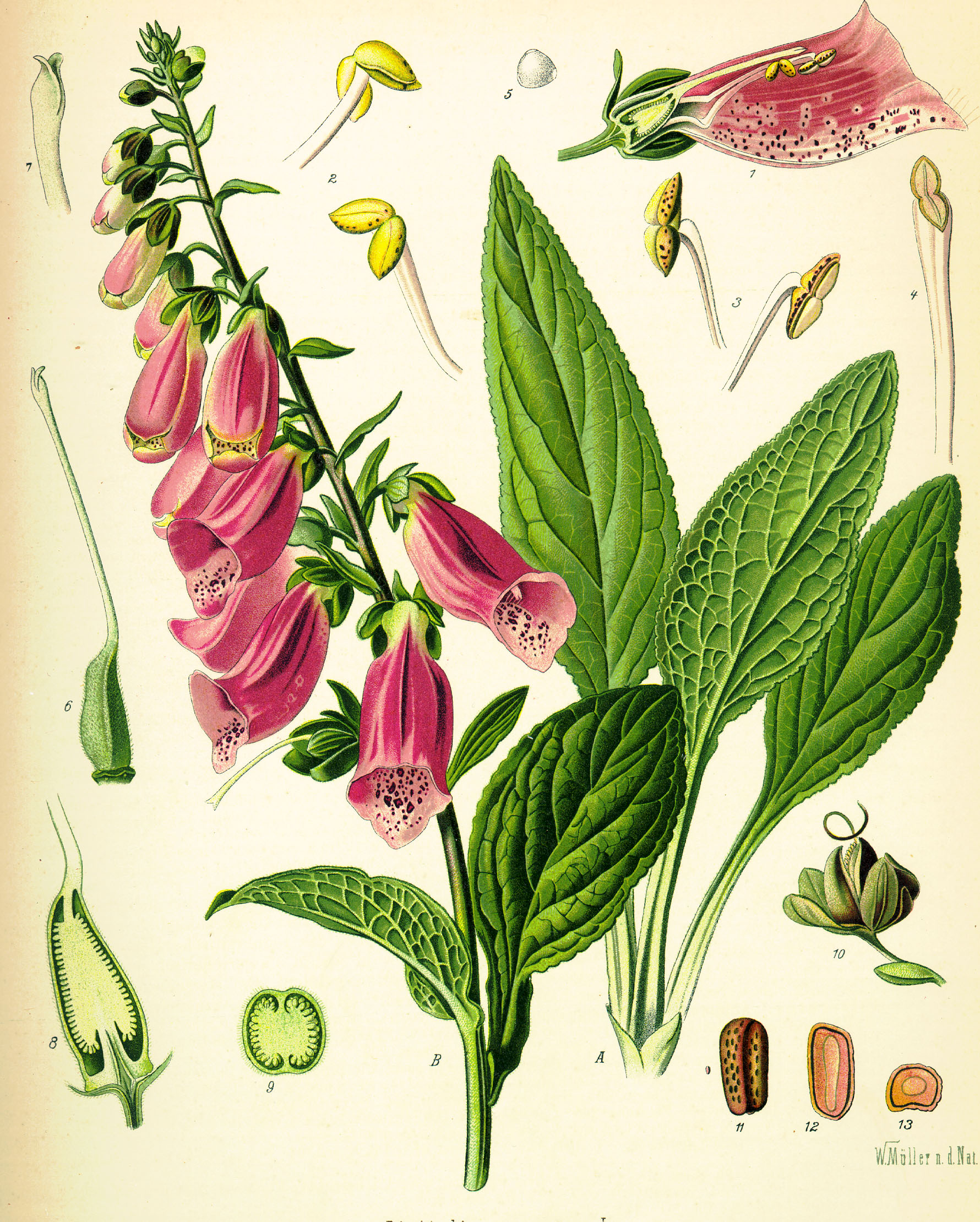
- Drawings of Digitalis purpurea
- Specialty: Emergency medicine
- Symptoms: vomiting, loss of appetite, confusion, blurred vision, changes in color perception, decreased energy
- Complications: Heart dysrhythmia
- Causes: Excessive digoxin, plants such as foxglove
- Risk factors: Low potassium, low magnesium, high calcium
- Differential diagnosis: Acute coronary syndrome, hyperkalemia, hypothyroidism, beta blocker toxicity
- Treatment: Supportive care, activated charcoal, atropine, digoxin-specific antibody fragments
- Frequency: ~2,500 cases per year (US)

Digoxin toxicity, also known as digoxin poisoning, is a type of poisoning that occurs in people who take too much of the medication digoxin or eat plants such as foxglove that contain a similar substance. Symptoms are typically vague. They may include vomiting, loss of appetite, confusion, blurred vision, changes in color perception, and decreased energy. Potential complications include an irregular heartbeat, which can be either too fast or too slow.

Toxicity may occur over a short period of time following an overdose or gradually during long-term treatment. Risk factors include low potassium, low magnesium, and high calcium. Digoxin is a medication used for heart failure or atrial fibrillation. An electrocardiogram is a routine part of diagnosis. Blood levels are only useful more than six hours following the last dose.

Activated charcoal may be used if it can be given within two hours of the person taking the medication. Atropine may be used if the heart rate is slow while magnesium sulfate may be used in those with premature ventricular contractions. Treatment of severe toxicity is with digoxin-specific antibody fragments. Its use is recommended in those who have a serious dysrhythmia, are in cardiac arrest, or have a potassium of greater than 5 mmol/L. Low blood potassium or magnesium should also be corrected. Toxicity may reoccur within a few days after treatment.

In Australia in 2012 there were about 140 documented cases. This is a decrease by half since 1994 as a result of decreased usage of digoxin. In the United States 2500 cases were reported in 2011 which resulted in 27 deaths. The condition was first described in 1785 by William Withering.

== Signs and symptoms ==
Digoxin toxicity is often divided into acute or chronic toxicity. In both of these toxicity, cardiac effects are of the greatest concern. With an acute ingestion, symptoms such as nausea, vertigo, and vomiting are prominent. On the other hand, nonspecific symptoms are predominant in chronic toxicity. These symptoms include fatigue, malaise, and visual disturbances.

The classic features of digoxin toxicity are nausea, vomiting, abdominal pain, headache, dizziness, confusion, delirium, vision disturbance (blurred or yellow vision). It is also associated with cardiac disturbances including irregular heartbeat, ventricular tachycardia, ventricular fibrillation, sinoatrial block and AV block.

Historical sources (18–19th century) also state that excessive consumption of Digitalis preparations can cause a wide range of adverse effects, primarily affecting the gastrointestinal, cardiovascular, nervous, and urinary systems. Reported symptoms included nausea, vomiting, abdominal pain, colic, diarrhoea, excessive sweating, dizziness, visual disturbances, muscular tremors, weakness, fainting, and impaired cognitive function. Cardiovascular manifestations included bradycardia, irregular and weak pulse, while urinary disturbances ranged from reduced urine output to anuria. More severe cases involved dyspnoea, difficulty swallowing, convulsions, coma, and death. Historical accounts also described peripheral oedema and disturbances of consciousness.

== Diagnosis ==
In individuals with suspected digoxin toxicity, a serum digoxin concentration, serum potassium concentration, creatinine, BUN, and serial electrocardiograms is obtained.

=== ECG ===
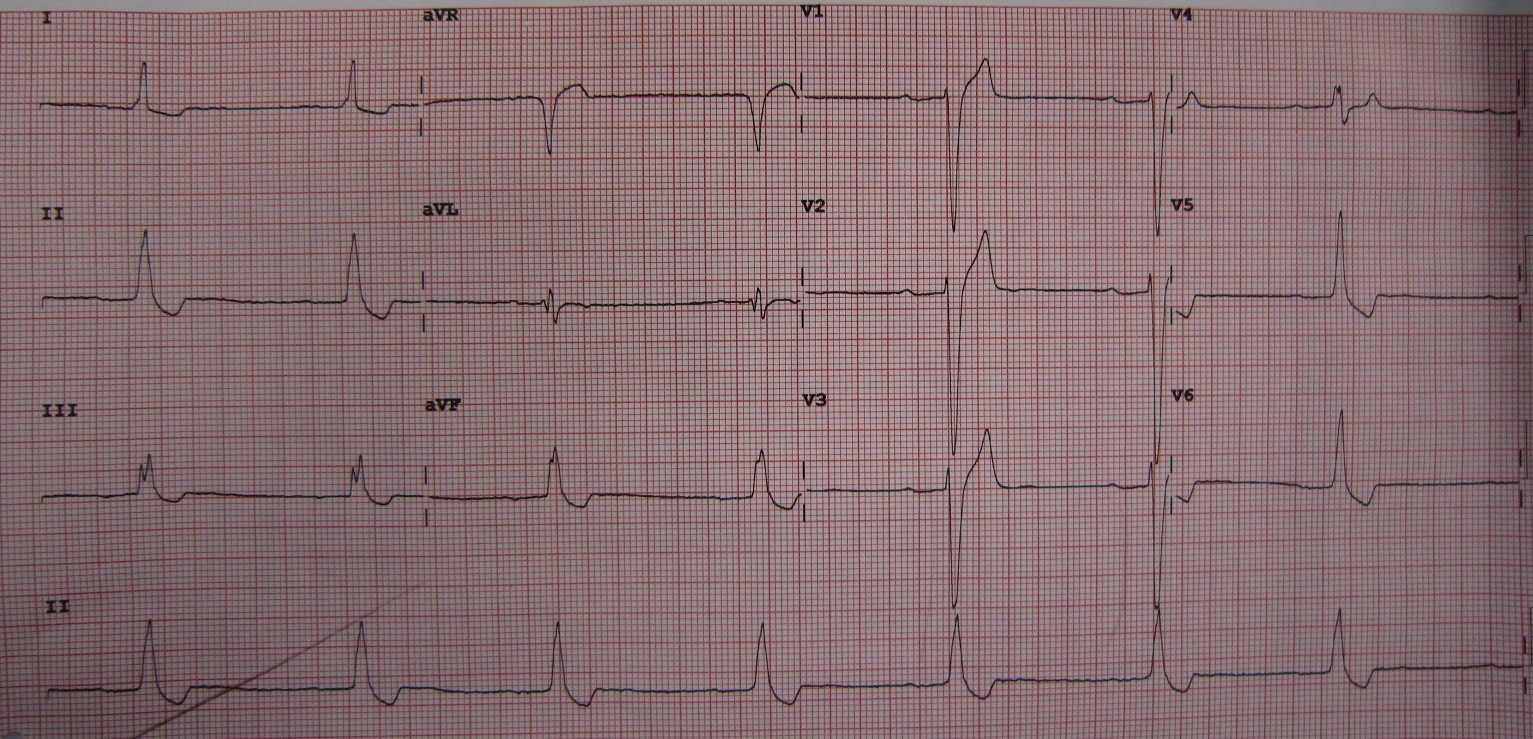
An ECG showing digoxin toxicity with the classic "scooped out" ST segment

In digoxin toxicity, the finding of frequent premature ventricular beats (PVCs) is the most common and the earliest dysrhythmia. Sinus bradycardia is also very common. In addition, depressed conduction is a predominant feature of digoxin toxicity. Other ECG changes that suggest digoxin toxicity include bigeminal and trigeminal rhythms, ventricular bigeminy, and bidirectional ventricular tachycardia.

=== Blood test ===
The level of digoxin for treatment is typically 0.5-2 ng/mL. Since this is a narrow therapeutic index, digoxin overdose can happen. A serum digoxin concentration of 0.5-0.9 ng/mL among those with heart failure is associated with reduced heart failure deaths and hospitalizations. It is therefore recommended that digoxin concentration be maintained in approximately this range if it is used in heart failure patients.

High amounts of the electrolyte potassium (K+) in the blood (hyperkalemia) is characteristic of digoxin toxicity. Digoxin toxicity increases in individuals who have kidney impairment. This is most often seen in elderly or those with chronic kidney disease or end-stage kidney disease.

== Treatment ==
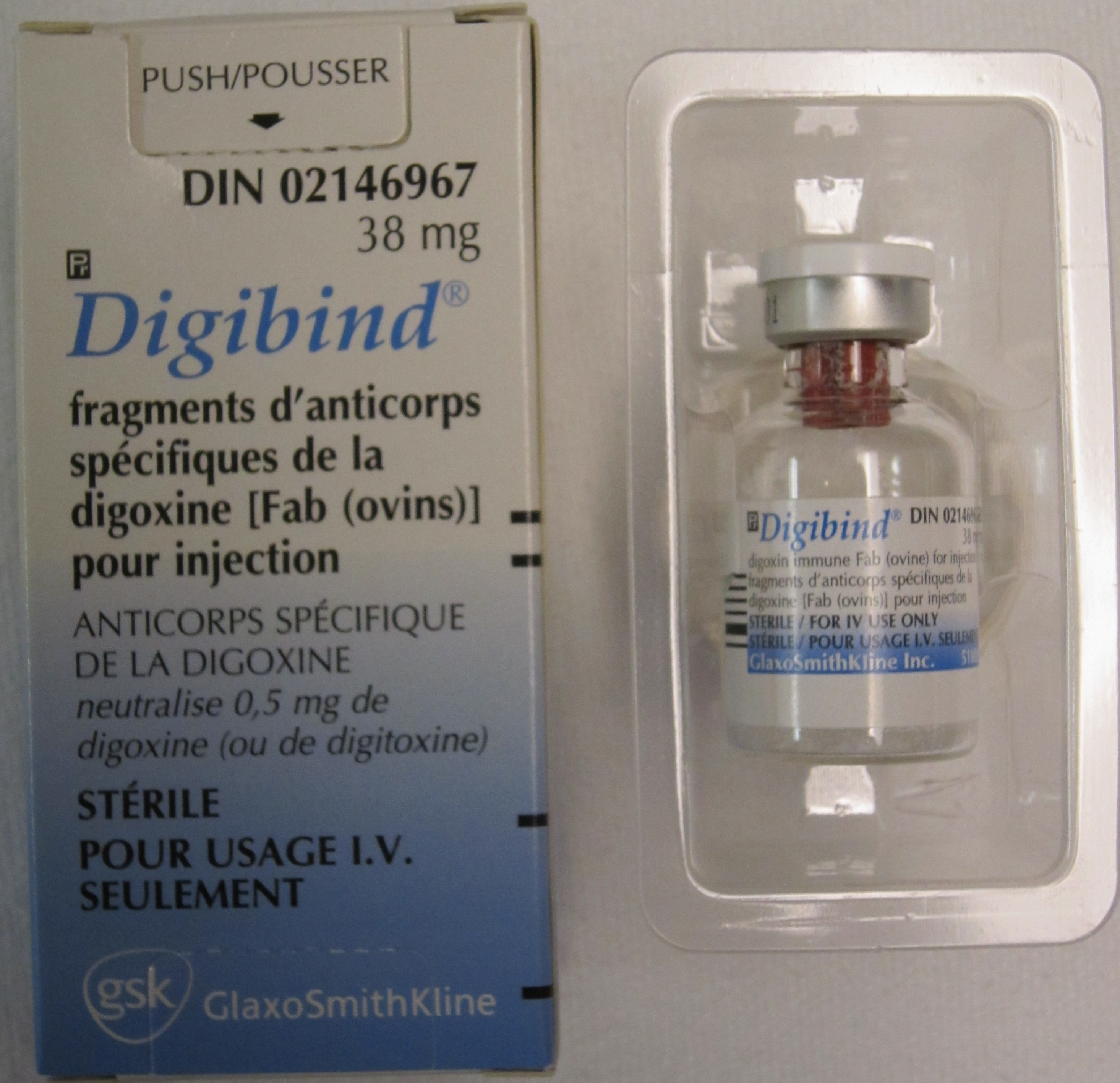
Digoxin immune Fab used to treat digoxin toxicity

The primary treatment of digoxin toxicity is digoxin immune fab, which is an antibody made up of anti-digoxin immunoglobulin fragments. This antidote has been shown to be highly effective in treating life-threatening signs of digoxin toxicity such as hyperkalemia, hemodynamic instability, and arrhythmias. Fab dose can be determined by two different methods. First method is based on the amount of digoxin ingested whereas the second method is based on the serum digoxin concentration and the weight of the person.

Other treatment that may be used to treat life-threatening arrhythmias until Fab is acquired are magnesium, phenytoin, and lidocaine. Magnesium suppresses digoxin-induced ventricular arrhythmias while phenytoin and lidocaine suppresses digoxin-induced ventricular automaticity and delay afterdepolarizations without depressing AV conduction. In the case of an abnormally slow heart rate (bradyarrhythmias), Atropine, catecholamines (isoprenaline or salbutamol), and/or temporary cardiac pacing can be used.
