= Tolevamer =

Chemical compound

Clinical data
- Trade names: Tolevamer

Pharmacokinetic data
- Bioavailability: None
- Metabolism: None
- Excretion: Faeces (100%)

Identifiers
- IUPAC name: Poly(4-vinylbenzenesulfonic acid)
- CAS Number: 28210-41-5
- PubChem CID: 75905
- DrugBank: DB01344
- ChemSpider: None
- UNII: ZSL2FB6GXN
- KEGG: D06178
- CompTox Dashboard (EPA): DTXSID301011079
- ECHA InfoCard: 100.167.553

Chemical and physical data
- Formula: [C_{8}H_{7}SO_{3}^{−}] _{n}

Tolevamer is a medication developed to combat Clostridioides difficile associated diarrhea. It is a potassium sodium polystyrene sulfonate. It was never marketed.

== Mechanism of action ==
Tolevamer was designed to bind the enterotoxins of Clostridioides difficile. Since it has no antibiotic properties, it does not harm the gut flora. Early studies used the sodium salt, but it was soon replaced with the potassium sodium salt to prevent hypokalaemia, which is often associated with diarrhea.

== History ==
=== Termination of development ===
In early 2008, a noninferiority study versus vancomycin or metronidazole for Clostridioides difficile associated diarrhea (CDAD) found that about half of the patients in the tolevamer group did not complete the treatment, versus 25% in the vancomycin and 29% in the metronidazole groups. CDAD recurrence in patients reaching clinical success was reduced significantly by tolevamer (6% recurrence rate), vancomycin (18%), and metronidazole (19%). However, the good result of tolevamer is partly due to the high drop-out rate in this group. Since tolevamer did not reach its primary endpoint in this study, its development was halted.
