= Sodium cellulose phosphate =

Clinical data
- AHFS/Drugs.com: Micromedex Detailed Consumer Information
- ATC code: V03AG01 (WHO)

Identifiers
- ChemSpider: none

Sodium cellulose phosphate is a drug used to treat hypercalcemia and hypercalciuria. It has been investigating for the prevention of kidney stones, but with limited efficacy.

This compound is an ion-exchange resin that can not be absorbed by the body. However, it can be used to restore the normal intestinal calcium absorption. When it is taken orally, it binds strongly to calcium and inhibits its absorption into the blood. From there, inhibition is caused due to the lower intraluminal calcium levels, which is typically available for absorption.

The mechanism of action of the drug compound can cause a couple of internal effects. Due to the binding activity of the compound with calcium, it will also bind with magnesium and cause a depletion in the body. Working off of this effect, sodium cellulose phosphate will bind with divalent intestinal cations. Because of this binding, more oxalate is available in the blood. This high level of oxalate within the intestine can also be a source of renal stones.

== Medical uses ==
=== Hypercalcemia ===
Hypercalcemia occurs when there is a raised level of calcium in the blood, compared to the normal range of 2.2–2.6 mmol/L. Typical symptoms of this condition include renal stones, bone pain, abdominal discomfort, and nausea/vomiting. More severe symptoms are associated with psychiatric overtones which are consumed with anxiety, depression, and insomnia.

=== Hypercalciuria ===
Hypercalciuria occurs when there is an elevated level of calcium in the urine. This condition is due to severe calcium reabsorption within the intestines.

=== Available forms ===
The major US dosage form of sodium cellulose phosphate is Calcibind, which was developed and brought to market by Mission Pharma. Calcibind is a powder dosage form, which comes in small, 2.5 gram doses, individually packaged. The patent for this product was approved on December 28, 1982. The product was eventually removed from the market for reasons that have not been found at this time.

== Research ==
In the late 1970s and early 1980s, physiological action studies took place to show how intestinal calcium was absorbed and how it affects other functions within the body. By a study done at the University of Texas, it was found that sodium cellulose phosphate inhibited calcium absorption through three separate techniques:

- Calcium balance studies
- External counting method
- Formal kinetic analysis

Through these studies, major conclusions were made regarding the drug compound. Sodium cellulose phosphate reduces the renal excretion of magnesium and calcium. Phosphate and oxalate were both increased in the urine, one due to intestinal hydrolysis and the other to a reduced oxalate complex. Overall, it was noted that the drug could be used to correct the increased calcium absorption that occurs in absorptive hypercalciuria.
