= Sick cell syndrome =

- Other names: Cell sickness syndrome

Sick cell syndrome is a medical condition characterised by reduced functioning of the cellular Na+/K+ pump, which is responsible for maintaining the internal ion homeostasis. The clinical result is a rise in blood K+ and drop of blood Na+ concentrations.

== Causes ==
There are a wide range of possible pathological conditions that can cause sick cell syndrome, including:

- hypoxia
- sepsis
- hypovolaemia
- malnourishment
- burns

This syndrome is well known in the field of palliative medicine as many terminal patients develop this condition.
