= Colestilan =

Chemical compound

Clinical data
- Trade names: BindRen
- AHFS/Drugs.com: International Drug Names
- Pregnancy category: B
- Routes of administration: Oral
- ATC code: V03AE06 (WHO)

Legal status
- Legal status: In general: ℞ (Prescription only)

Pharmacokinetic data
- Bioavailability: Not absorbed
- Protein binding: NA
- Metabolism: Not absorbed
- Excretion: Gut

Identifiers
- IUPAC name: 2-(chloromethyl)oxirane 2-methyl-1H-imidazole copolymer
- CAS Number: 95522-45-5
- PubChem CID: 65840
- ChemSpider: none
- UNII: VSI302RYSR
- KEGG: D01934
- ChEMBL: ChEMBL2103800
- CompTox Dashboard (EPA): DTXSID40914950

Chemical and physical data
- Formula: (C_{4}H_{5}ClN_{2})_{m}(C_{3}H_{6}O)_{n}

Colestilan (INN, trade name BindRen) is a medication that acts as a phosphate binder and bile acid sequestrant. It is an ion-exchange resin, is an orally administered bile acid sequestrant that is being developed by Mitsubishi Tanabe Pharma Corporation for the treatment of hypercholesterolaemia and hyperphosphataemia. It has been launched in Japan for hypercholesterolaemia. For the treatment of hyperphosphataemia, it is launched in Austria, Germany, the Czech Republic, Portugal and the United Kingdom, is registered in the EU. Phase III development in paediatric patients with hyperphosphataemia associated with chronic kidney disease was underway in the UK and Germany. However, the company discontinued the development. In addition, the phase II development in type-2 diabetes mellitus and phase I development in hyperphosphataemia, in Japan, was also discontinued by the company.

Phase III development for hyperphosphataemia was previously underway in the US. However, Mitsubishi Tanabe Pharma discontinued development in this market. Colestilan was also investigated in phase III trials in Europe and Asia for hypercholesterolaemia. However, as of March 2015, no recent reports of development have been identified for the drug in this indication

== Clinical use ==
Colestilan is used for the treatment of hyperphosphataemia (too high phosphate concentrations in the blood serum) in patients undergoing dialysis, including peritoneal dialysis.

== Contraindications ==
Colestilan is contraindicated in patients with bowel obstruction.

== Interactions ==
The substance can inhibit the resorption of other drugs, as well as fat soluble vitamins (A, D, E, K) and folate, from the gut. Resulting lower blood levels can be clinically problematic with immunosuppressant and antiepileptic drugs.

== Adverse effects ==
Adverse effects include gastrointestinal problems such as constipation, as well as vitamin and calcium deficiency. Vitamin K deficiency sometimes causes gastrointestinal bleeding.

== Chemistry and mechanism of action ==
Colestilan is a cross-linked copolymer of 2-methylimidazole and epichlorohydrin and works as an anion exchanger resin with affinity to phosphate, bile acid anions and urate. It binds these anions in the gut and removes them from the enterohepatic circulation. Colestilan is not absorbed from the gut, but is excreted together with the bound anions.

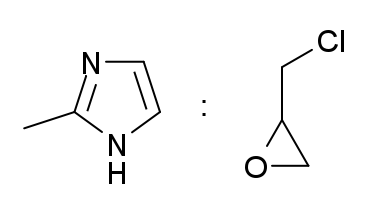
2-methyl-1H-imidazole (left) and epichlorohydrin (right)
