= Glucarpidase =

Pharmaceutical drug

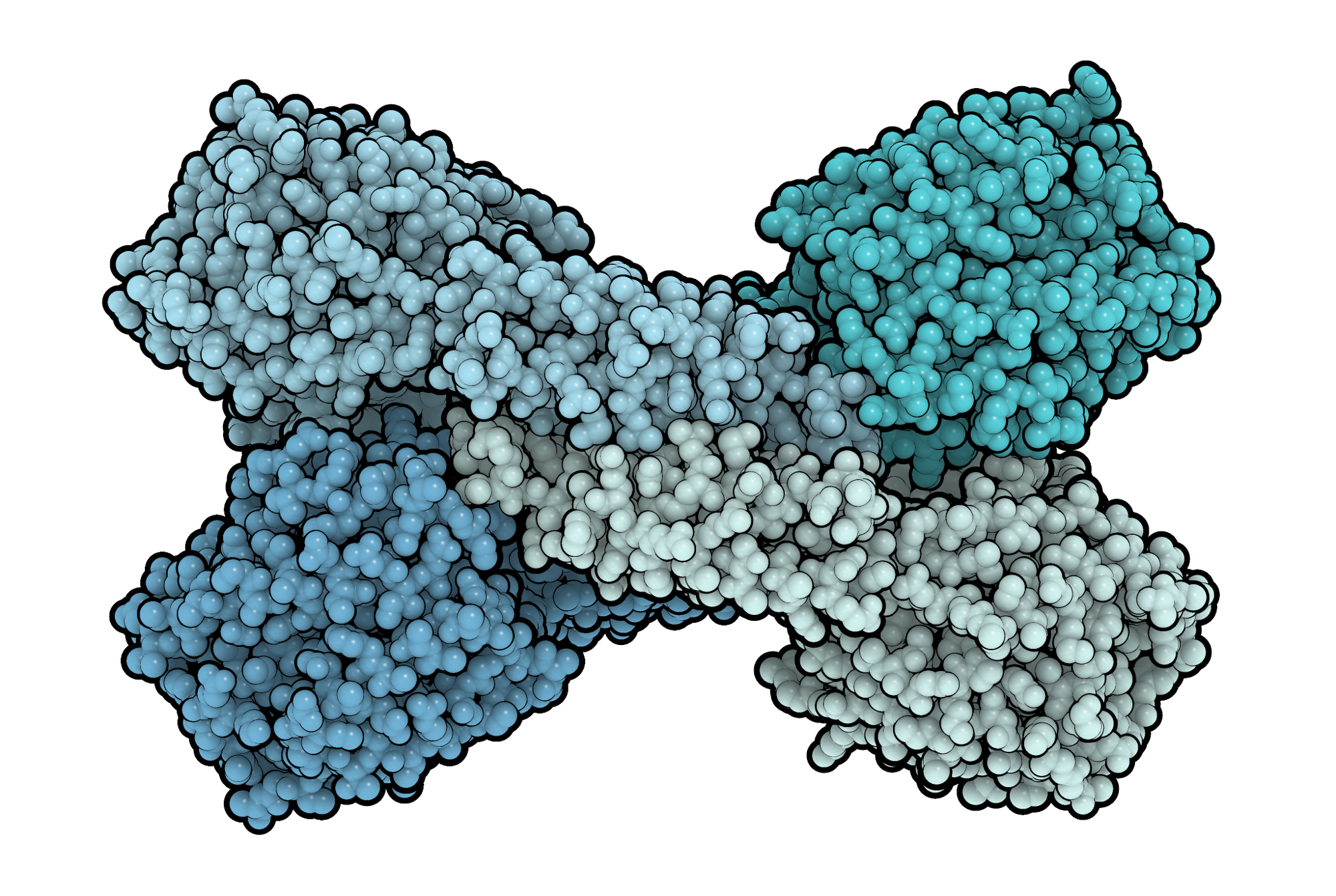
- PDB: 1CG2

Clinical data
- Trade names: Voraxaze
- AHFS/Drugs.com: Monograph
- MedlinePlus: a613009
- License data: US DailyMed: Glucarpidase
- Routes of administration: Intravenous
- ATC code: V03AF09

Legal status
- Legal status: US: ℞-only; EU: Rx-only

Identifiers
- IUPAC name: Recombinant glutamate carboxypeptidase (carboxypeptidase G2)
- CAS Number: 9074-87-7
- IUPHAR/BPS: 7450
- DrugBank: DB08898
- ChemSpider: none
- UNII: 2GFP9BJD79
- KEGG: D10260
- ChEMBL: ChEMBL1863515
- ECHA InfoCard: 100.029.968

Chemical and physical data
- Formula: C_{1950}H_{3157}N_{543}O_{599}S_{7}
- Molar mass: 44017.33 g·mol^{−1}

Glucarpidase (Voraxaze) is a medication used for the treatment of elevated levels of methotrexate (defined as 1 micromol/L) during treatment of cancer patients who have impaired kidney function (and thus cannot reduce the drug to safe levels sufficiently after the drug has been given). Glucarpidase is an enzyme that inactivates methotrexate rapidly after injection. Because this agent reduces systemic levels of methotrexate and could therefore interfere with efficacy, it is not recommended for use in patients with normal or only slightly impaired kidney function or in whom serum levels are normal. The main antidote for methotrexate overdoses prior to the approval of this drug were high doses of folinic acid. However, this agent was not always sufficient at preventing kidney failure due to methotrexate. Glucarpidase also degrades folinic acid so the two should not be used together (within two hours of one another).

Glucarpidase, a recombinant form of the bacterial enzyme carboxypeptidase G2 converts methotrexate into glutamate and 2,4-diamino-N(10)-methylpteroic acid. These are generally much less toxic and are excreted largely by the liver. One case series in children has found that high-dose methotrexate therapy can be resumed after an instance of methotrexate-induced acute kidney injury successfully treated with glucarpidase.

Adverse effects include mild and include numbness, tingling, flushing, nausea, vomiting, itching, and headache.

== Society and culture ==
=== Legal status ===
In November 2021, the Committee for Medicinal Products for Human Use (CHMP) of the European Medicines Agency (EMA) adopted a positive opinion, recommending the granting of a marketing authorization under exceptional circumstances for the medicinal product Voraxaze, intended to reduce toxic plasma methotrexate concentration. The applicant for this medicinal product is SERB SAS. Glucarpidase was approved for medical use in the European Union in January 2022.
