= Digoxin immune fab =

Pharmaceutical drug

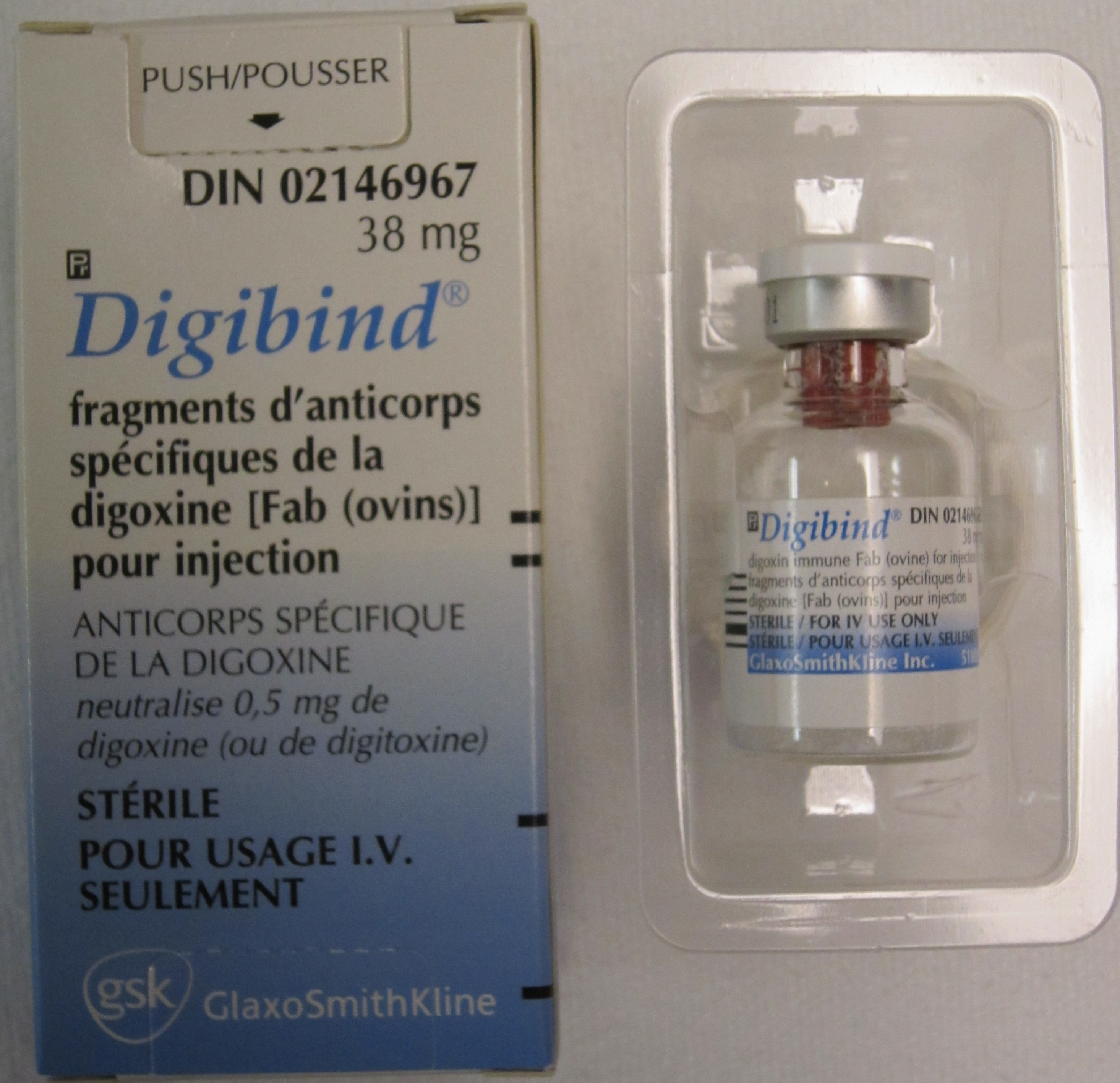
- Bottle of digoxin immune fab

Clinical data
- Trade names: Digibind, others
- AHFS/Drugs.com: Consumer Drug Information
- Routes of administration: IV infusion, injection
- ATC code: V03AB24 (WHO)

Legal status
- Legal status: AU: S4 (Prescription only)

Pharmacokinetic data
- Onset of action: 30 min
- Elimination half-life: 15 hours for DigiFab, 23 hours for Digibind
- Duration of action: 15 to 20 hrs
- Excretion: Kidney

Identifiers
- IUPAC name: Anti-digoxin antibody fragment
- DrugBank: DB00076
- ChemSpider: none
- ChEMBL: ChEMBL1201588

Chemical and physical data
- Formula: C_{2085}H_{3223}N_{553}O_{672}S_{16}
- Molar mass: 47301.88 g·mol^{−1}

Digoxin immune fab or digoxin-specific antibody is an antidote for overdose of digoxin. It is made from immunoglobulin fragments from sheep that have already been immunized with a digoxin derivative, digoxindicarboxymethoxylamine (DDMA). Its brand names include Digibind (GlaxoSmithKline) and DigiFab (BTG plc).

== Medical uses ==
It is used for digoxin toxicity. Digoxin toxicity can emerge during long-term therapy as well as after an overdose. It can occur even when the serum digoxin concentration is within the therapeutic range when one of the following is present:

1. Hemodynamically unstable arrhythmia
2. End organ damage
3. digoxin level > 4 ng/ml if chronic ingestion
4. digoxin level > 10 ng/ml if acute ingestion
5. potassium > 5 mEq/L and symptomatic

Side effects of digoxin immune fab may occur:

- hives
- difficult breathing
- swelling of the lips, tongue, face, or throat
- itching
- skin redness
- wheezing
- cough
- lightheadedness

== Contraindications ==
Avoid use in hypokalemia as this drug, while reversing the effects of digitalis, will further reduce serum potassium levels and could precipitate dangerous and even fatal cardiac arrhythmias.

The patient must be closely monitored for anaphylactic shock, and anyone allergic to sheep protein, papain, bromelain, or papaya extracts (papain is used to cleave the antibody into Fab and Fc fragments) should not use ovine digoxin immune fab. Because it is relatively new, no drug interaction studies have been performed yet.

== Pharmacology ==
It works by binding to the digoxin, rendering it unable to bind to its action sites on target cells. The complexes accumulate in the blood and are eliminated by the kidneys and reticuloendothelial system.

== Regulatory information and clinical studies ==
Case series have reported benefits from anti‐digoxin Fab, but data regarding the response in acute or chronic poisoning are conflicting. Recent observational data support an effect in acute poisoning, but efficacy in chronic poisoning be minimally effective in alleviating cardiac toxicities in chronic digoxin poisoning. Data also support outcomes of acute digoxin poisoning without use of anti‐digoxin Fab. A case series of 147 patients showed that not all cases of acute digoxin overdose require anti‐digoxin Fab, nor should anti‐digoxin Fab dose be calculated based on ingested dose. In contrast, a higher mortality (7.6%) was noted in a case series of acute and chronic digoxin and digitoxin poisoning despite Fab being used first line. Further, a retrospective case‐controlled study of chronic digoxin poisoning did not observe a beneficial effect of anti‐digoxin Fab on mortality. An RCT (n = 66) in yellow oleander poisoning showed an early improvement in cardiac rhythm and hyperkalaemia from anti‐digoxin Fab, prompting early termination of the trial. It was not powered to detect a change in mortality and no deaths were noted. As with all foreign proteins, anaphylaxis, serum sickness or febrile reactions are a source of concern, especially with repeated administration. These reactions appear uncommon for example, in a study of 717 adults where only six patients (0.8%) exhibited any evidence of allergic response. Nevertheless, theoretically, patients previously dependent upon the inotropic effects of digoxin could develop heart failure and hypokalaemia could result within 1–5 hours, owing to intracellular shifts of potassium, as the effects of digoxin are reversed. Patients who require redigitalization must wait for the complexes to be eliminated from the body by the kidneys, this taking 2–3 days with normal renal function. Unfortunately, fab fragments interfere with both fluorescence excitation transfer immunoassays and radioimmunoassays for digoxin. This means that serum drug levels cannot be monitored until the drug-antibody complexes are cleared from the circulation.

== Intellectual property ==
DigiFab is used as an antidote to treat a life-threatening overdose of digoxin or digitoxin. DigiFab is manufactured and distributed by BTG international Inc. under U.S. License No. 186. DigiFab is a sterile, lyophilized preparation of digoxin-immune ovine Fab (monovalent) immunoglobulin fragments. It is prepared by isolating the immunoglobulin fraction of the ovine serum, digesting it with papain and isolating the digoxin-specific Fab fragments by affinity chromatography. These antibody fragments have a molecular weight of approximately 46,000 Da. Each vial of DigiFab, which will bind approximately 0.5 mg digoxin, contains 40 mg of digoxin immune Fab, 75 mg (approx) of mannitol USP, and 2 mg (approx) sodium acetate USP as a buffering agent. The product contains no preservatives and is intended for intravenous administration.

Digibind is manufactured by GlaxoSmithkline, SpA, Parma Italy under US License No. 129. It s distributed by GSK.

A patent to use digoxin immunoglobulins C07k16/44 as a regulator of the preeclamptic/eclamptic patient's sodium/potassium ATPase activity was issued in 2003.

== Commercial aspects ==
Price increase was reported to range from US $380 to US $750 during 2013 for digoxin-Fab. However, these price increases are not reflective of the United States average AWP for digoxin-Fab as it represents Australian costs converted to US. Prior to 2011, Digibind and DigiFab pricing was US $797 per 38 mg vial and US $786 per 40 mg vial respectively. After GSK discontinued Digibind sale in USA in 2011, the AWP of DigiFab increases by 15% to US $903 per 40 mg vial. AWP of DigiFab has continued to increase as much as 54% occurring in March 2014 to US $2,370 per 40 mg vial. However, the cost may vary depending on wholesaler contractor manufacturer rebates.
