= Hypoaldosteronism =

Endocrine disorder of a lack of the hormone aldosterone

- Aldosterone
- Specialty: Endocrinology

Hypoaldosteronism is an endocrinological disorder characterized by decreased levels of the hormone aldosterone. Similarly, isolated hypoaldosteronism is the condition of having lowered aldosterone without corresponding changes in cortisol. (The two hormones are both produced by the adrenals.)

== Presentation ==
Hypoaldosteronism causes low sodium (hyponatremia), high potassium (hyperkalemia), and metabolic acidosis, a condition in which the body produces excess acid. These conditions are responsible for the symptoms of hypoaldosteronism, which include muscle weakness, nausea, palpitations, irregular heartbeat, and abnormal blood pressure.

== Causes ==
There are several causes for this condition, including adrenal insufficiency, congenital adrenal hyperplasia, and some medications such as certain diuretics, NSAIDs, and ACE inhibitors.

- Primary aldosterone deficiency
1. Primary adrenal insufficiency
2. Congenital adrenal hyperplasia (21 but not 11β and 17)
3. Aldosterone synthase deficiency
- Secondary aldosterone deficiency
1. Secondary adrenal insufficiency
2. Diseases of the pituitary or hypothalamus
- Hyporeninemic hypoaldosteronism (due to decreased angiotensin 2 production as well as intra-adrenal dysfunction)
1. Renal dysfunction-most commonly diabetic nephropathy
2. NSAIDs
3. Ciclosporin

== Mechanism ==
Hypoaldosteronism may result in high blood potassium and is the cause of 'type 4 renal tubular acidosis', sometimes referred to as hyperkalemic RTA or tubular hyperkalemia. However, the acidosis, if present, is often mild. It can also cause urinary sodium wasting, leading to volume depletion and hypotension.

When adrenal insufficiency develops rapidly, the amount of Na+ lost from the extracellular fluid exceeds the amount excreted in the urine, indicating that Na+ also must be entering cells. When the posterior pituitary is intact, salt loss exceeds water loss and the plasma Na+ falls. However, the plasma volume also is reduced, resulting in hypotension, circulatory insufficiency, and, eventually, fatal shock. These changes can be prevented to a degree by increasing the dietary NaCl intake. Rats survive indefinitely on extra salt alone, but in dogs and most humans, the amount of supplementary salt needed is so large that it is almost impossible to prevent eventual collapse and death unless mineralocorticoid treatment is also instituted.

== Diagnosis ==
Patients with a suspected diagnosis of hypoaldosteronism are often screened with simple blood tests. Potassium levels, plasma aldosterone concentration and plasma renin activity are the three most useful in the first instance. Low aldosterone levels in the presence of high renin activity, often with low sodium, high potassium, is associated with primary hypoaldosteronism. Secondary hypoaldersteronism may be suspected if renin activity is low with low aldosterone concentrations. The plasma aldosterone-to-renin ratio is calculated to determine if levels are sufficiently deranged to consider a diagnosis of hypoaldosteronism.

If screening test is suggestive, a more definitive diagnosis is made by performing a saline suppression test, ambulatory salt loading test, or fludrocortisone suppression test. Imaging to detect an Adrenocortical adenoma may also be considered.

== Treatment ==
- Aldosterone deficiency should be treated with a mineralocorticoid (such as fludrocortisone), as well as possibly a glucocorticoid for cortisol deficiency if present.
- Hyporeninemic hypoaldosteronism is amenable to fludrocortisone treatment, but the accompanying hypertension and edema can prove a problem in these patients, so often a diuretic (such as the thiazide diuretic, bendrofluazide, or a loop diuretic, such as furosemide) is used to control the hyperkalemia.

== See also ==
- Addison's disease
- Adrenal gland
- Hyperaldosteronism
- Pseudohypoaldosteronism
