= Glutamate carboxypeptidase =

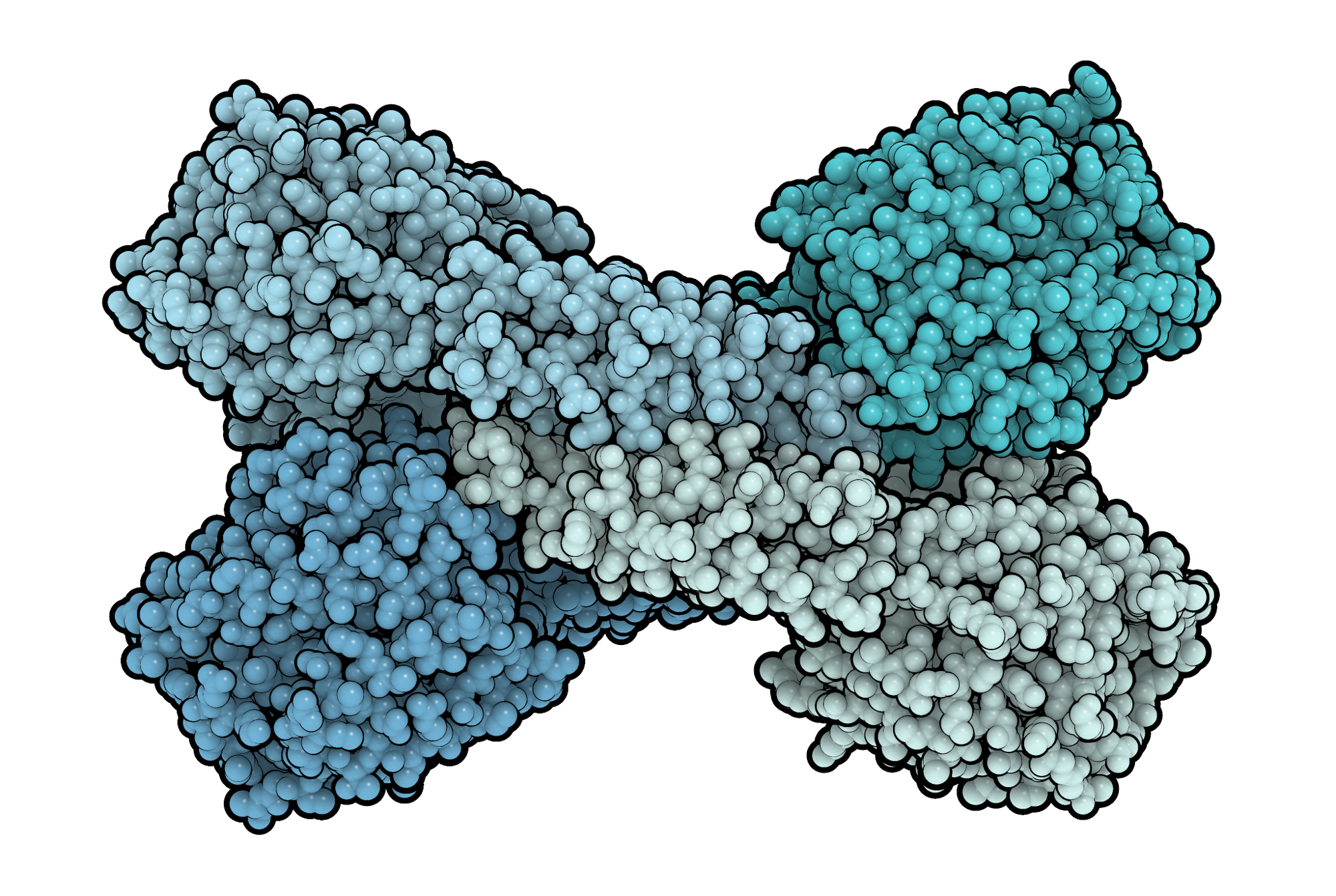
- Space-filling model of Pseudomonas carboxypeptidase G2, expressed in Escherichia coli. PDB: 1CG2.

Identifiers
- EC no.: 3.4.17.11
- CAS no.: 9074-87-7

Databases
- IntEnz: IntEnz view
- BRENDA: BRENDA entry
- ExPASy: NiceZyme view
- KEGG: KEGG entry
- MetaCyc: metabolic pathway
- PRIAM: profile
- PDB structures: RCSB PDB PDBe PDBsum
Search
- PMC: articles
- PubMed: articles
- NCBI: proteins

Glutamate carboxypeptidase (EC 3.4.17.11, carboxypeptidase G, carboxypeptidase G1, carboxypeptidase G2, glutamyl carboxypeptidase, N-pteroyl-L-glutamate hydrolase) is an enzyme. This enzyme catalyses the following chemical reaction

Release of C-terminal glutamate residues from a wide range of N-acylating moieties, including peptidyl, aminoacyl, benzoyl, benzyloxycarbonyl, folyl and pteroyl groups

This zinc enzyme is produced by pseudomonads, Flavobacterium sp. and Acinetobacter sp.

== See also ==
- Glutamate carboxypeptidase II
