= Polystyrene sulfonate =

Drug class

Clinical data
- Trade names: Sodium salt: Kayexalate, Kionex, Resonium A Calcium salt: Calcium Resonium, Kalitake, Sorbisterit, Resikali; Potassium and sodium salt: Tolevamer
- AHFS/Drugs.com: Monograph
- MedlinePlus: a682108
- Routes of administration: By mouth, retention enema
- ATC code: V03AE01 (WHO)

Legal status
- Legal status: In general: ℞ (Prescription only)

Pharmacokinetic data
- Bioavailability: None
- Metabolism: None
- Excretion: Faeces (100%)

Identifiers
- IUPAC name: Poly(4-vinylbenzenesulfonic acid)
- CAS Number: 9002-23-7
- PubChem CID: 75905
- DrugBank: DB01344
- ChemSpider: None
- UNII: 70KO0R01RY
- KEGG: DG01160

Chemical and physical data
- Formula: [C_{8}H_{7}SO_{3}^{−}] _{n}

Polystyrene sulfonates are a group of medications used to treat high blood potassium. Therapeutic effects generally appear hours to days after commencement of therapy. Common side effects include loss of appetite, gastrointestinal upset, constipation, and low blood calcium. Polystyrene sulfonates are given by mouth with a meal, or rectally by retention enema. Oral formulations often also contain the laxative sorbitol in order to lessen the risk of constipation which can be severe.

Polystyrene sulfonates are derived from polystyrene by the addition of sulfonate functional groups. Sodium polystyrene sulfonate was approved for medical use in the United States in 1958. A polystyrene sulfonate was developed in the 2000s to treat Clostridioides difficile associated diarrhea under the name Tolevamer, but it was never marketed.

Polystyrene sulfonates are also used in technical applications to remove potassium, calcium, and sodium from solutions.

== Medical uses ==
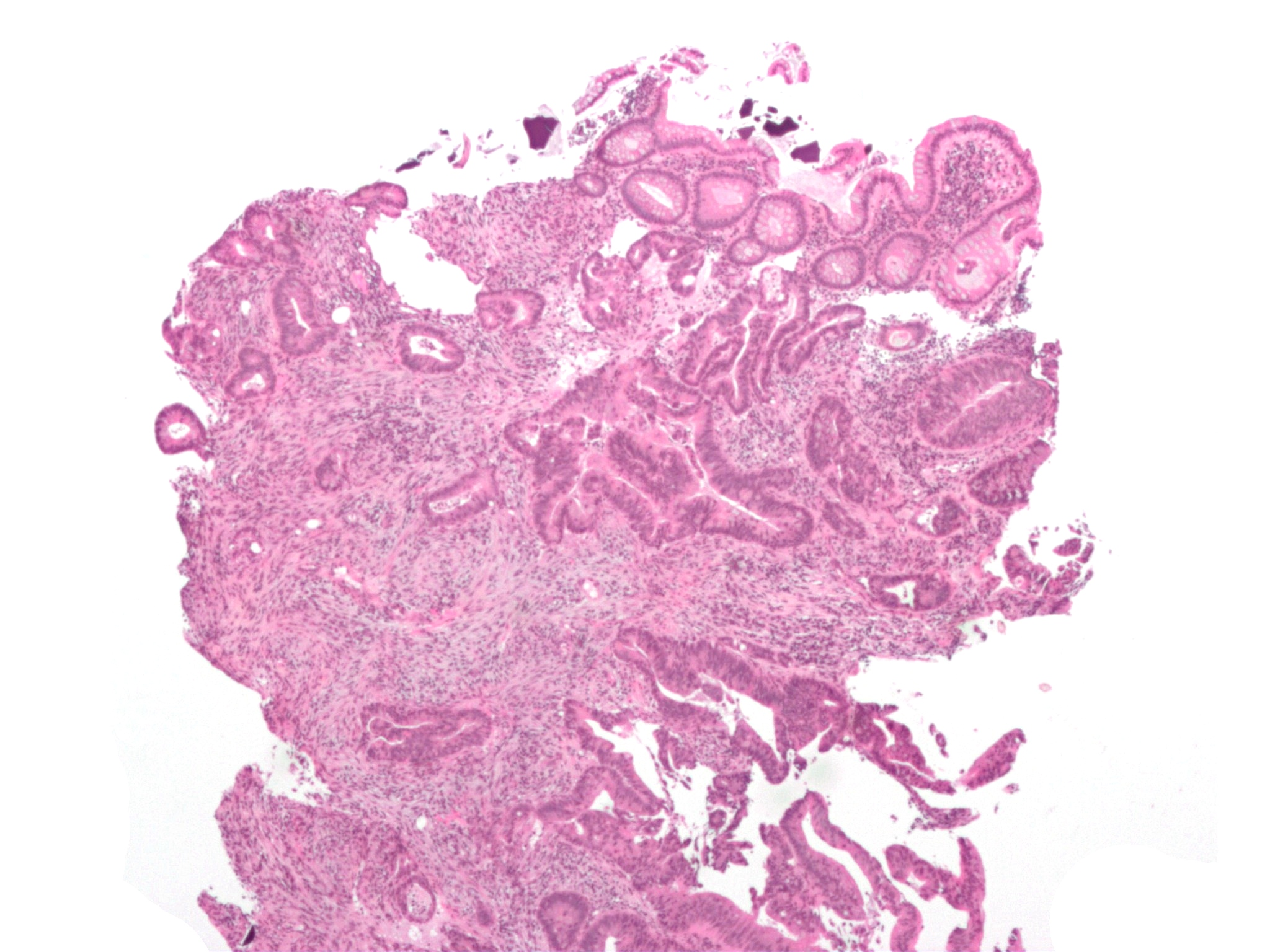
Micrograph showing sodium polystyrene sulfonate crystals (purple – at top of the image) in the biopsy of a colonic mass. H&E stain.

Polystyrene sulfonate is typically supplied in the form of either a sodium or a calcium salt. It is used medically as a potassium binder in hyperkalemia (high blood potassium) occurring in the context of acute and chronic kidney disease. The medication has a delayed onset of action and is effective in sequestering potassium over the longer-term, however, its effectiveness in acute management of hyperkalemia is tenuous.

== Adverse effects ==
=== Gastrointestinal ===
Intestinal disturbances are common, including loss of appetite, nausea, vomiting, and constipation. Constipation can be severe, culminating in life-threatening fecal impaction. In rare cases, use has been associated with colonic necrosis.

==== Gastrointestinal injury ====
Severe gastrointestinal complications are relatively rare, however, use of this medication is widespread (e.g., about 5 million doses prescribed per year in the U.S.) in spite of poor evidence for its efficacy and availability of alternative treatments, so a large population of patients is subject to potentially unnecessarily risk of GI injury. No statistically rigorous evidence regarding the actual incidence of severe GI adverse effects with this medication is available.

GI injury occurs both with polystyrene sulfonate alone or in formulations containing sorbitol. It can occur with oral or rectal administration. Polystyrene sulfonate may be directly toxic to the intestinal mucosa, inducing a local inflammatory response that causes vascular injury. Co-administration of sorbitol is thought to compound the risk of GI injury by independently promoting vascular injury by causing vasospasm and prostaglandin-mediated pro-inflammatory effects.

Mortality in cases with severe GI injury is high (possibly due to co-morbidities in affected patients). The large intestine is most commonly affected, however, with oral administration, more proximal GI segments (including the stomach and oesophagus) are affected in about 30% of cases (usually with concurrent large intestine involvement). Milder and less clearly attributable cases of GI injury may go unnoted.

Numerous comorbidities and risk factors may predispose individuals to severe GI complications (notably kidney disease, solid organ transplantation with immunosuppressive medication use, and post-operative state), possibly by promoting GI vasoconstriction or impairing intestinal regeneration or causing impaired GI mobility.

=== Electrolyte changes ===
Changes in electrolyte blood levels such as hypomagnesemia, hypocalcemia, and hypokalemia may occur.

== Contraindications ==
Polystyrene sulfonates should not be used in people with obstructive bowel disease and in newborns with reduced gut motility.

== Interactions ==
Polystyrene sulfonates can bind to various drugs within the digestive tract and thus lower their absorption and effectiveness. Common examples include lithium, thyroxine, and digitalis. In September 2017, the FDA recommended separating the dosing of polystyrene sulfonate from any other oral medications by at least three hours to avoid any potential interactions.

== Mechanism of action ==
Polystyrene sulfonates release sodium or calcium ions in the stomach in exchange for hydrogen ions. When the resin reaches the large intestine the hydrogen ions are exchanged for free potassium ions, and the resin is then eliminated in the feces. The net effect is lowering the amount of potassium available for absorption into the blood and increasing the amount that is excreted via the feces. The effect is a reduction of potassium levels in the body, at a capacity of 1 mEq of potassium exchanged per 1 g of resin. The fact that the medication's site of action is the large intestine explains the delayed and prolonged effects seen with oral administration.

== Production and chemical structure ==
Polystyrene sulfonic acid, the acid whose salts are the polystyrene sulfonates, has the idealized formula (CH_{2}CHC_{6}H_{4}SO_{3}H)_{n}. The material is prepared by sulfonation of polystyrene:

(CH_{2}CHC_{6}H_{5})_{n} + n SO_{3} → (CH_{2}CHC_{6}H_{4}SO_{3}H)_{n}

Several methods exist for this conversion, which can lead to varying degree of sulfonation. Usually the polystyrene is crosslinked, which keeps the polymer from dissolving. Since the sulfonic acid group (SO_{3}H) is strongly acidic, this polymer neutralizes bases. In this way, various salts of the polymer can be prepared, leading to sodium, calcium, and other salts:

(CH_{2}CHC_{6}H_{4}SO_{3}H)_{n} + n NaOH → (CH_{2}CHC_{6}H_{4}SO_{3}Na)_{n} + n H_{2}O

These ion-containing polymers are called ionomers.

=== Alternative sulfonation methods ===
Double substitutions of the phenyl rings are known to occur, even with conversions well below 100%. Crosslinking reactions are also found, where condensation of two sulfonic acid groups yields a sulfonyl crosslink. On the other hand, the use of milder conditions such as acetyl sulfate leads to incomplete sulfonation. Recently, the atom transfer radical polymerization (ATRP) of protected styrene sulfonates has been reported, leading to well defined linear polymers, as well as more complicated molecular architectures.

== Chemical uses ==
Polystyrene sulfonates are useful because of their ion exchange properties. Linear ionic polymers are generally water-soluble, whereas cross-linked materials (called resins) do not dissolve in water. These polymers are classified as polysalts and ionomers.

=== Water softening ===
Water softening is achieved by percolating hard water through a bed of the sodium form of cross-linked polystyrene sulfonate. The hard ions such as calcium (Ca^{2+}) and magnesium (Mg^{2+}) adhere to the sulfonate groups, displacing sodium ions. The resulting solution of sodium ions is softened.

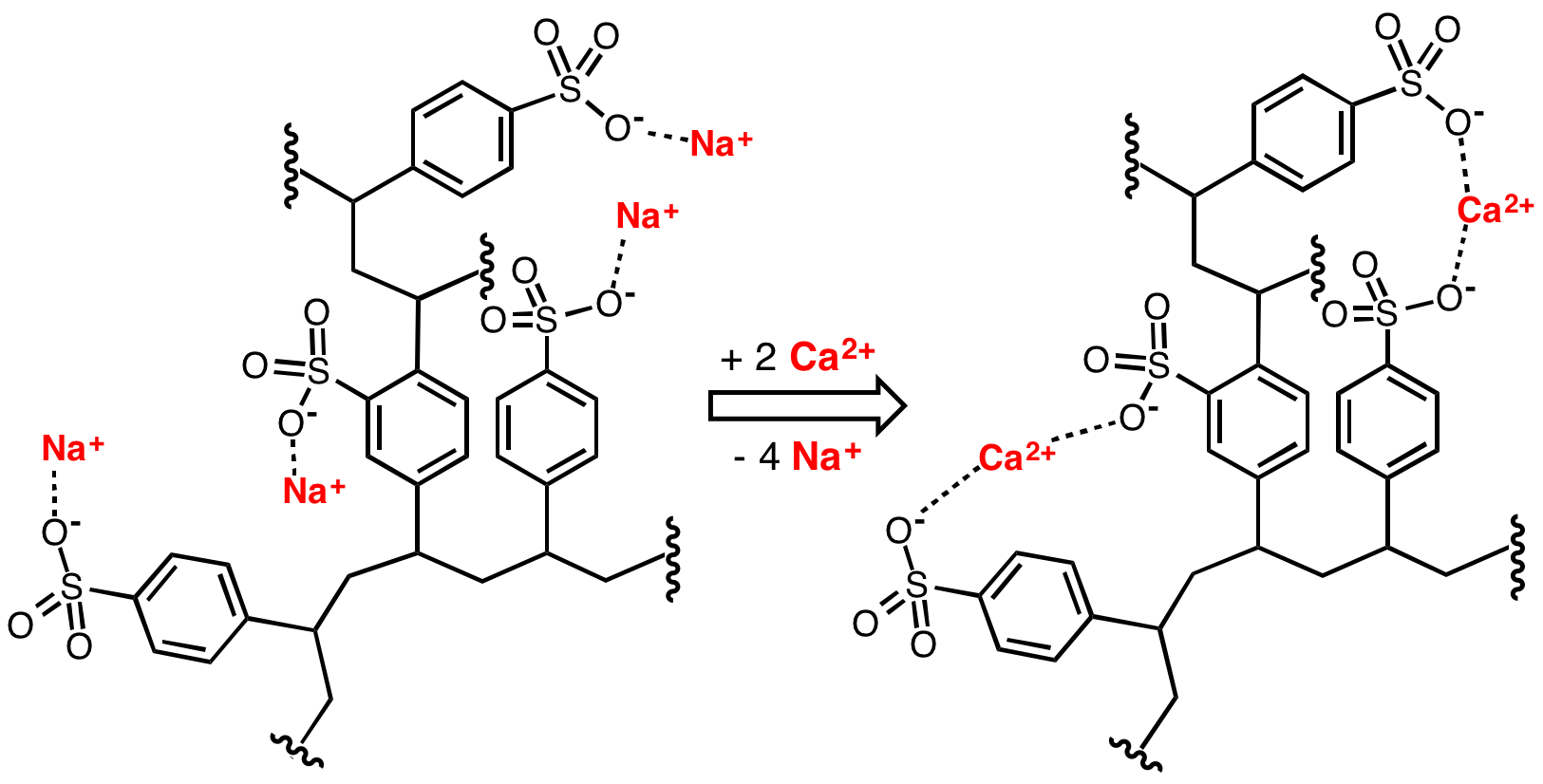
Idealized image of water softening process involving replacement of calcium ions in water with sodium ions donated by a cation exchange resin.

=== Other uses ===
Sodium polystyrene sulfonate is used as a superplastifier in cement, as a dye improving agent for cotton, and as proton exchange membranes in fuel cell applications. In its acid form, the resin is used as a solid acid catalyst in organic synthesis, mostly commonly under the tradename Amberlyst.
