= Ardem Patapoutian =

Molecular biologist, neuroscientist, and Nobel laureate 2021

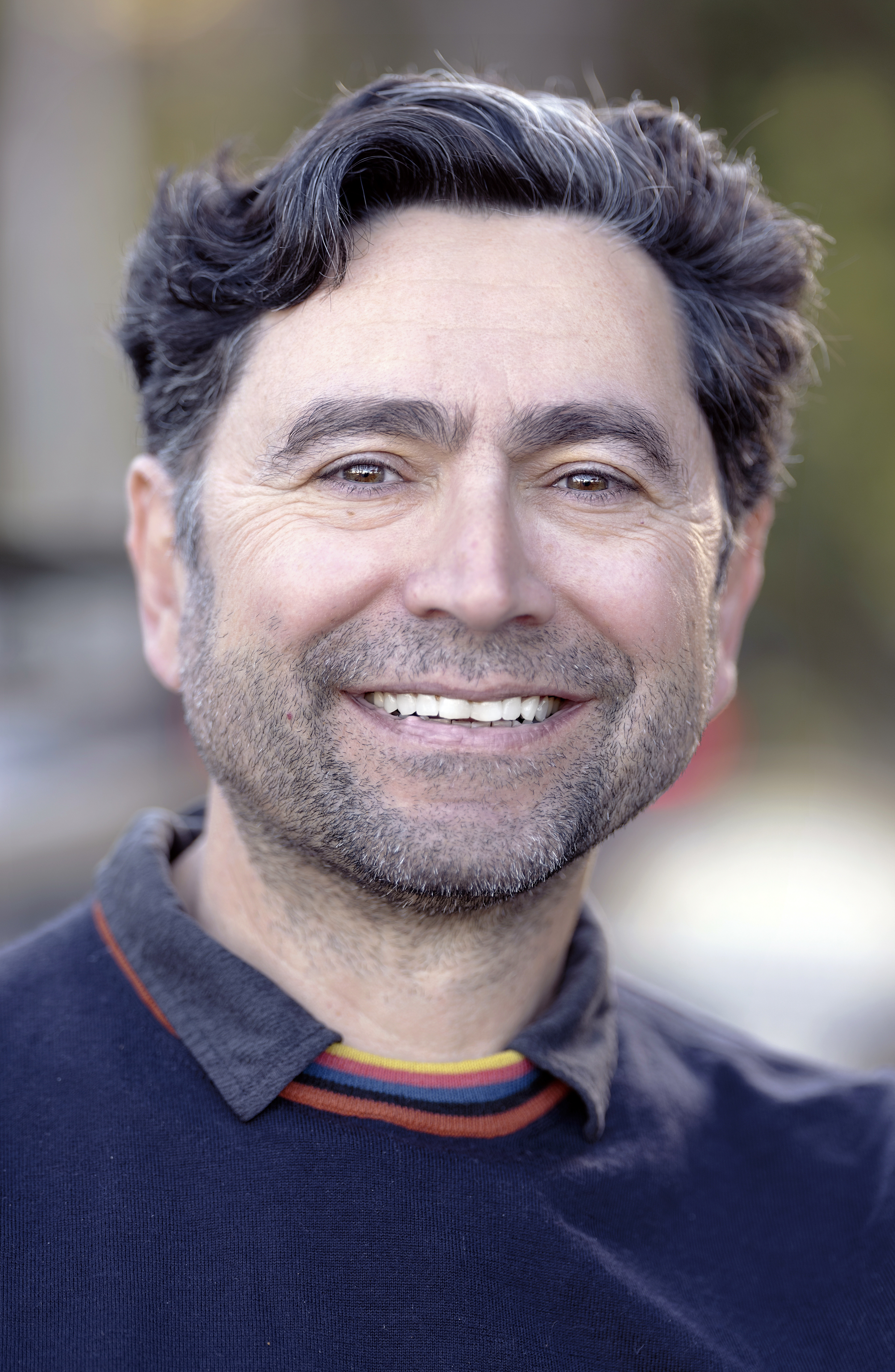
- Patapoutian in 2022
- Born: 1 October 1967 (age 59); Beirut, Lebanon
- Citizenship: Armenia; Lebanon; United States
- Education: American University of Beirut; University of California, Los Angeles (BS); California Institute of Technology (MS, PhD)
- Known for: research of PIEZO1, PIEZO2, TRPM8 receptors
- Children: 1 son
- Parent: Sarkis Vahakn
- Awards: Nobel Prize in Physiology or Medicine (2021); W. Alden Spencer Award (2017)
- Scientific career
- Fields: Molecular biology, neuroscience
- Workplaces: Scripps Research
- Thesis: The role of the MyoD family genes during mouse development (1996)
- Doctoral advisor: Barbara Wold

Ardem Patapoutian (Arabic: آرديم باتابوتيان, Armenian: Արտեմ Փաթափութեան; born 1 October 1967) is a Lebanese-American molecular biologist, neuroscientist, and Nobel Prize laureate of Armenian descent. He is known for his work in characterizing the PIEZO1, PIEZO2, and TRPM8 receptors that detect pressure, menthol, and temperature. Patapoutian is a neuroscience professor and Howard Hughes Medical Institute investigator at Scripps Research in La Jolla, California. In 2021, he won the Nobel Prize in Physiology or Medicine jointly with David Julius.

== Early life ==
Patapoutian was born to a Lebanese Armenian family in Beirut, Lebanon. His father, Sarkis Patapoutian (better known by the pen name Sarkis Vahakn), is a poet and an accountant, while his mother, Haiguhi Adjemian, was the principal of an Armenian school in Beirut. He has a brother, Ara, and a sister, Houry. His grandparents settled in Lebanon from Hadjin after surviving the Armenian Genocide.

He is childhood friends with journalist and author Vicken Cheterian. He attended the Demirdjian and Hovagimian Armenian schools in Beirut. The Lebanese Civil War began when Patapoutian was 8 years old, and the conflict led many of his friends and neighbors to flee the country. By his freshman year of high school, Patapoutian was one of just five students in his grade.

Patapoutian enrolled at the American University of Beirut as a pre-med major for a year before he had a personal encounter with militants in the city. The militants captured Patapoutian as he was crossing from East to West Beirut and threatened to shoot him in the knee. Though they soon released him, Patapoutian called this experience "the final straw." In 1986, Patapoutian and his brother immigrated to the United States as refugees. Once in the United States, Patapoutian worked odd jobs, such as delivering pizzas and writing horoscopes for an Armenian newspaper, as he established residency in the state of California.

He received a B.S. degree in cell and developmental biology from the University of California, Los Angeles in 1990 and a PhD degree in biology from the California Institute of Technology in 1996 under direction of Barbara Wold.

As a postdoctoral fellow, Patapoutian worked with Louis F. Reichardt at the University of California, San Francisco. In 2000, he became an assistant professor at Scripps Research (then known as The Scripps Research Institute). Between 2000 and 2014, he had an additional research position for the Novartis Research Foundation. Since 2014, Patapoutian has been an investigator for the Howard Hughes Medical Institute (HHMI).

== Personal life ==
Patapoutian, a naturalized U.S. citizen, lives in Del Mar, California with his wife Nancy Hong, a venture capitalist, and son, Luca.

== Research ==
Patapoutian's research is into the biological receptors for temperature and touch (nociception). The knowledge is used to develop treatments for a range of diseases, including chronic pain. The discoveries made it possible to understand how heat, cold and mechanical forces trigger nerve impulses.

Patapoutian researches the signal transduction of sensors. Patapoutian and co-workers inactivated genes. In this way, they identified the gene, that made the cells insensitive for touch. The channel for the sense of touch was called PIEZO1 (transl. pressure). Through its similarity to PIEZO1, a second gene was discovered and named PIEZO2. This ion channel, the more important of the two mechanoreceptors, is essential for the sense of touch. PIEZO1 and PIEZO2 channels have been shown to regulate additional important physiological processes including blood pressure, respiration and urinary bladder control.

Patapoutian also made significant contributions to the identification of novel ion channels and receptors that are activated by temperature, mechanical forces or increased cell volume. Patapoutian and his collaborators were able to show that these ion channels play an outstanding role in the sensation of temperature, in the sensation of touch, in proprioception, in the sensation of pain and in the regulation of vascular tone. More recent work uses functional genomics techniques to identify and characterize mechanosensitive ion channels (mechanotransduction).

== Awards and honors ==
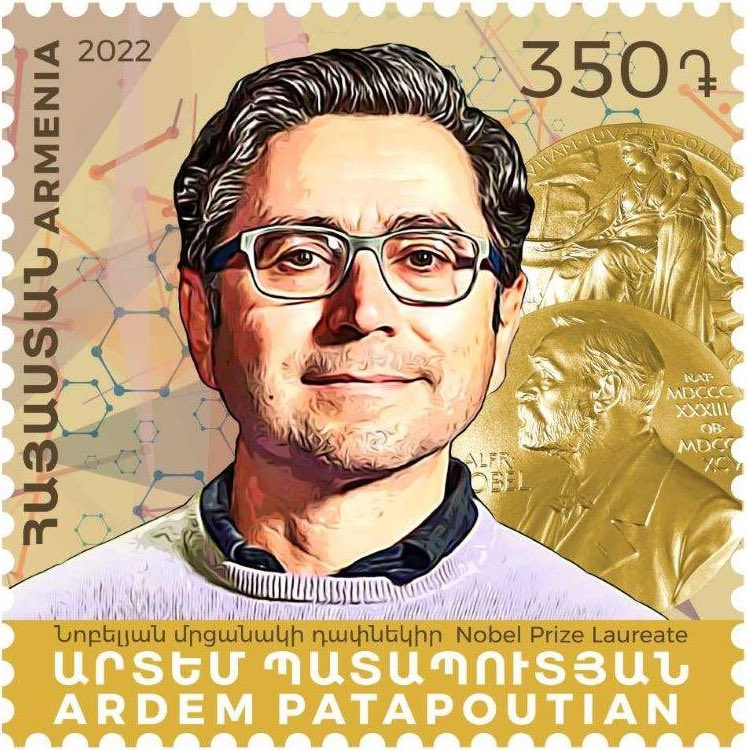
Patapoutian on a 2022 stamp of Armenia

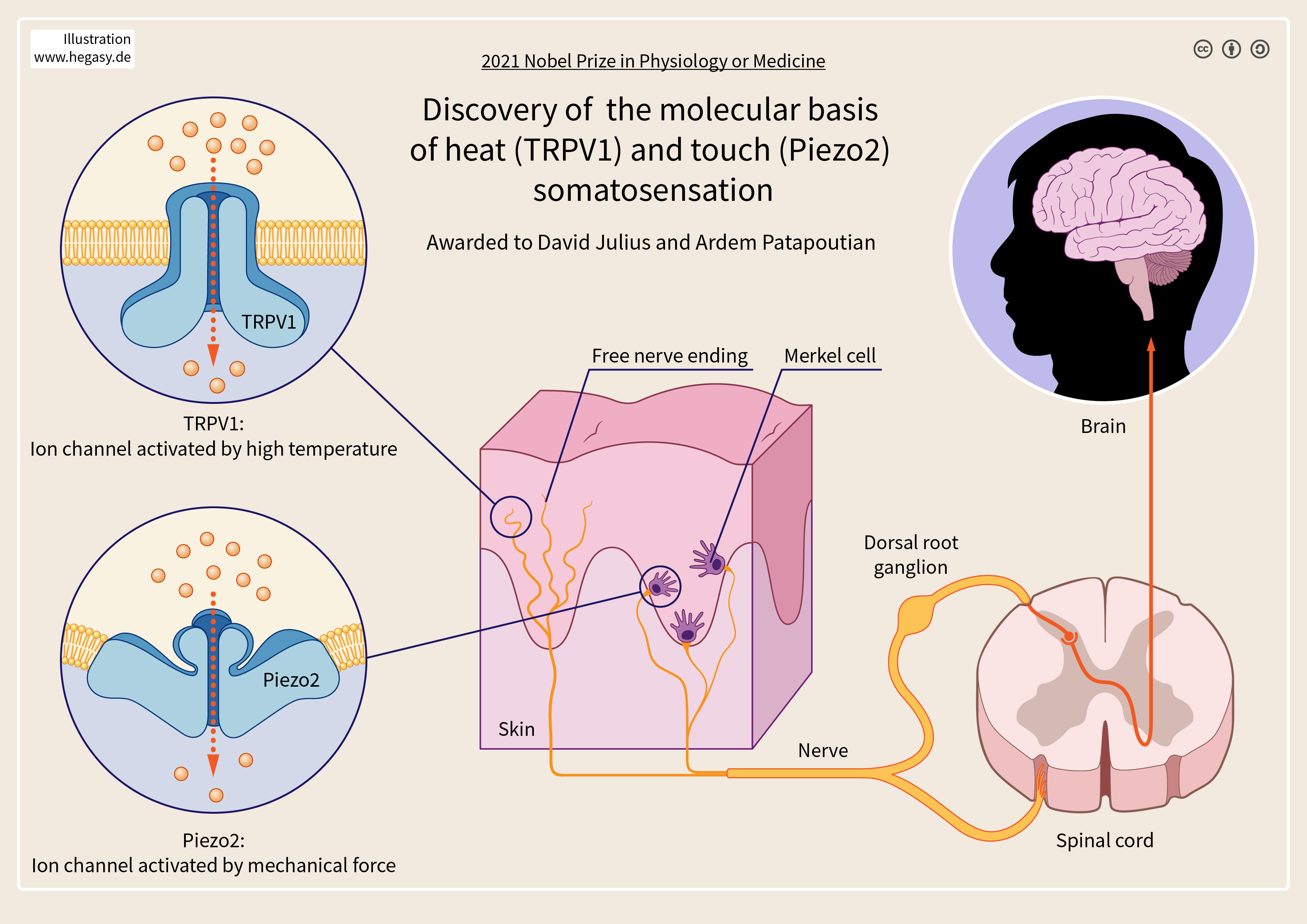
Nobel Prize in Physiology or Medicine 2021: Discovery of TRPV1 and PIEZO2

Patapoutian has an h-index of 68 according to Google Scholar, and of 63 according to Scopus (As of May 2020). He has been a Fellow of the American Association for the Advancement of Science since 2016, a member of the National Academy of Sciences since 2017 and of the American Academy of Arts and Sciences since 2020.

In 2017, Patapoutian received the W. Alden Spencer Award (Columbia University), in 2019 the Rosenstiel Award, in 2020 the Kavli Prize for Neuroscience, and the BBVA Foundation Frontiers of Knowledge Award in Biology / Biomedicine.

In 2021, he was awarded the Nobel Prize in Physiology or Medicine jointly with David Julius for their discoveries of receptors for temperature and touch.

In October 2021 President of Lebanon Michel Aoun awarded Patapoutian the Lebanese Order of Merit.

In 2022, Patapoutian was named by Carnegie Corporation of New York as an honoree of the Great Immigrants Award.

=== Recognition in Armenia ===
Patapoutian, the first Armenian Nobel laureate, received a hero's welcome when he visited Armenia in June 2022. Prime Minister Nikol Pashinyan awarded him the Order of St. Mesrop Mashtots, while the Armenian National Academy of Sciences elected him an honorary member, and the Yerevan State Medical University awarded him an honorary doctorate. Patapoutian gifted a replica of his Nobel medal to the History Museum of Armenia. HayPost issued a stamp dedicated to him.

== Selected publications ==
=== PIEZO1 + PIEZO2 ===
- Coste, B.; Mathur, J.; Schmidt, M.; Earley, T. J.; Ranade, S.; Petrus, M. J.; Dubin, A. E.; Patapoutian, A. (September 2, 2010). "Piezo1 and Piezo2 Are Essential Components of Distinct Mechanically Activated Cation Channels". Science. 330 (6000). American Association for the Advancement of Science (AAAS): 55–60. Bibcode:2010Sci...330...55C. doi:10.1126/science.1193270. ISSN 0036-8075. PMC 3062430. PMID 20813920.
- Coste, Bertrand; Xiao, Bailong; Santos, Jose S.; Syeda, Ruhma; Grandl, Jörg; Spencer, Kathryn S.; Kim, Sung Eun; Schmidt, Manuela; Mathur, Jayanti; Dubin, Adrienne E.; Montal, Mauricio; Patapoutian, Ardem (February 19, 2012). "Piezo proteins are pore-forming subunits of mechanically activated channels". Nature. 483 (7388). Springer Science and Business Media LLC: 176–181. Bibcode:2012Natur.483..176C. doi:10.1038/nature10812. ISSN 0028-0836. PMC 3297710. PMID 22343900.
- Kim, Sung Eun; Coste, Bertrand; Chadha, Abhishek; Cook, Boaz; Patapoutian, Ardem (February 19, 2012). "The role of Drosophila Piezo in mechanical nociception". Nature. 483 (7388). Springer Science and Business Media LLC: 209–212. Bibcode:2012Natur.483..209K. doi:10.1038/nature10801. ISSN 0028-0836. PMC 3297676. PMID 22343891.

=== PIEZO2 ===
- Ranade, Sanjeev S.; Woo, Seung-Hyun; Dubin, Adrienne E.; Moshourab, Rabih A.; Wetzel, Christiane; Petrus, Matt; Mathur, Jayanti; Bégay, Valérie; Coste, Bertrand; Mainquist, James; Wilson, A. J. (December 2014). "Piezo2 is the major transducer of mechanical forces for touch sensation in mice". Nature. 516 (7529): 121–125. Bibcode:2014Natur.516..121R. doi:10.1038/nature13980. ISSN 1476-4687. PMC 4380172. PMID 25471886.
- Woo, Seung-Hyun; Ranade, Sanjeev; Weyer, Andy D.; Dubin, Adrienne E.; Baba, Yoshichika; Qiu, Zhaozhu; Petrus, Matt; Miyamoto, Takashi; Reddy, Kritika; Lumpkin, Ellen A.; Stucky, Cheryl L.; Patapoutian, Ardem (April 6, 2014). "Piezo2 is required for Merkel-cell mechanotransduction". Nature. 509 (7502). Springer Science and Business Media LLC: 622–626. Bibcode:2014Natur.509..622W. doi:10.1038/nature13251. ISSN 0028-0836. PMC 4039622. PMID 24717433.
