= Jody Rosenblatt =

American biologist

Jody Rosenblatt FRSB
- Born: Utah
- Education: University of California, San Francisco; University of California, Berkeley
- Scientific career
- Workplaces: Francis Crick Institute; University of Utah; King's College London; University College London
- Thesis: Regulation of actin polymerization and depolymerization dynamics in the cell (1998)
- Doctoral advisor: Tim Mitchison

Jody Rosenblatt is an American biologist who is a professor of Cell Biology at King's College London. Her research investigates how epithelial sheets maintain cell number homeostasis. She discovered cell extrusion, a process that removes unwanted cells whilst maintaining epithelial integrity.

== Early life and education ==
Rosenblatt is from Utah, United States. She was an undergraduate student at the University of California, Berkeley. In an interview with the Journal of Cell Biology, she explained that as a sophomore she did not know that she wanted to become a scientist. She took nine months out of school and moved to Ireland, where she worked on a goat farm. When she returned to America, she got a job working in a laboratory at the University of Utah. After graduating, she spent a year working at Chiron Corporation with Michael Houghton, who received the Nobel Prize for his discovery of the Hepatitis C Virus. There she helped develop the first PCR screening methods for this virus, which prior to this was infecting 1 in 100 pints of blood. Before deciding to pursue a PhD, she joined David O. Morgan's laboratory at the University of California, San Francisco, where she discovered CDK2, a homologue of Cyclin-dependent kinase 1 and helped resolve its crystal structure. She has said that at the time new things were being discovered once a week, which made the field very exciting. For her doctoral research, she worked with Timothy Mitchison, also at University of California, San Francisco on actin filament turnover. She moved to the University College London Medical Research Council Laboratory for Molecular Cell Biology as a postdoctoral researcher, where she was originally planning to work on wound healing. Whilst closely monitoring wounds that she had created in embryonic epithelia, she identified small, single celled wounds that she had not created.—hallmarks of a process she termed epithelial cell extrusion. Epithelial cells form a barrier around organs, yet experience some of the highest rates of cell turnover of any cells in the body. Mechanosensing through PIEZO1 triggers the cell extrusion process. When extrusion becomes dysregulated it can cause inflammatory disease or cell invasion.

== Research and career ==
Rosenblatt started her research group at the University of Utah, where she was appointed the H. A. and Edna Benning Endowed Chair. She looked to understand the mechanisms that guide extrusion and its implications in biological processes. She demonstrated that extrusion was important to cell crowding. She moved to King's College London in 2019, where she holds a joint position with the Francis Crick Institute.

Rosenblatt investigates how epithelial cells maintain a balance through cell death and division. She discovered that these processes are regulated by mechanical forces: overcrowding of cells causes some to become extruded and subsequently die, when they are too sparse, they stretch and divide. Both processes rely on PIEZO1, a stretch-activated calcium channel. Proper extrusion is crucial for controlling epithelial cell numbers. Dysregulation in this process can lead to aggressive metastatic cancers and asthma. From their identification that the pathological crowding of an asthma attack can cause so much extrusion that it destroys the airway epithelial lining, causing the ensuing inflammation and hypersusceptibility to infection that can cause more attacks, they are investigating a new way to prevent asthma attacks altogether.

== Selected publications ==
- Bagley, Dustin C.; Russell, Tobias; Ortiz-Zapater, Elena; Stinson, Sally; Fox, Kristina; Redd, Polly F.; Joseph, Merry; Deering-Rice, Cassandra; Reilly, Christopher; Parsons, Maddy; Brightling, Christopher; Rosenblatt, Jody (2024). "Bronchoconstriction damages airway epithelia by crowding-induced excess cell extrusion". Science. 384 (6691): 66–73. Bibcode:2024Sci...384...66B. doi:10.1126/science.adk2758. hdl:10550/108714.
- George T. Eisenhoffer; Patrick D. Loftus; Masaaki Yoshigi; Hideo Otsuna; Chi-Bin Chien; Paul A. Morcos; Jody Rosenblatt (15 April 2012). "Crowding induces live cell extrusion to maintain homeostatic cell numbers in epithelia". Nature. 484 (7395): 546–549. Bibcode:2012Natur.484..546E. doi:10.1038/nature10999. ISSN 1476-4687. PMC 4593481. PMID 22504183. Wikidata Q34268263.
- Hendrik L. De Bondt; Jody Rosenblatt; Jarmila Jancarik; Heather D. Jones; David O. Morgan; Sung-Hou Kim (1 June 1993). "Crystal structure of cyclin-dependent kinase 2". Nature. 363 (6430): 595–602. Bibcode:1993Natur.363..595D. doi:10.1038/363595a0. ISSN 1476-4687. PMID 8510751. Wikidata Q29622946.
- A J Weiner; G Kuo; D W Bradley; et al. (1 January 1990). "Detection of hepatitis C viral sequences in non-A, non-B hepatitis". The Lancet. 335 (8680): 1–3. doi:10.1016/0140-6736(90)90134-q. ISSN 0140-6736. PMID 1967327. Wikidata Q43564387.
