= Cell extrusion =

Process in cell biology

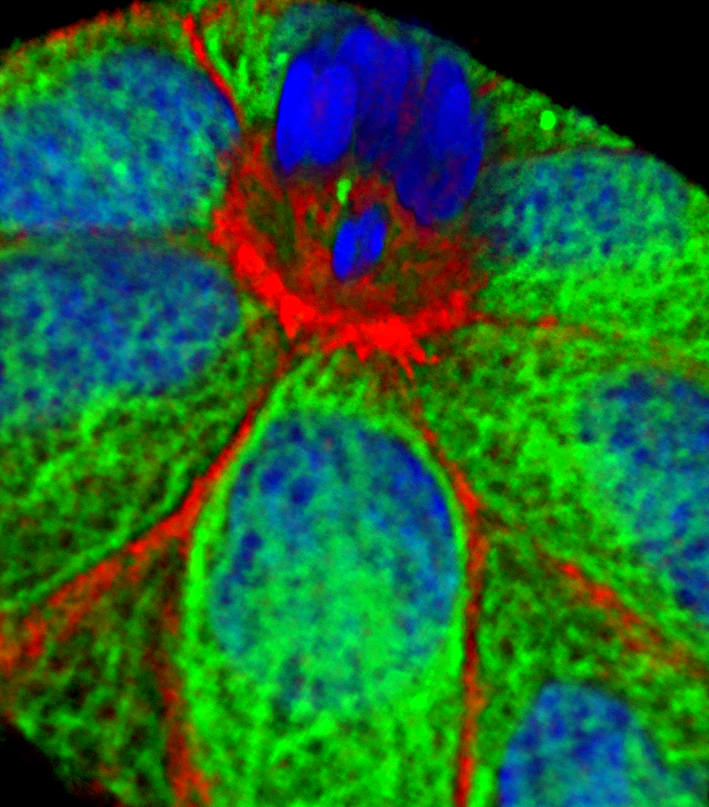
A cell being extruded from an epithelium, with actin in red, microtubules in green, and DNA in blue.

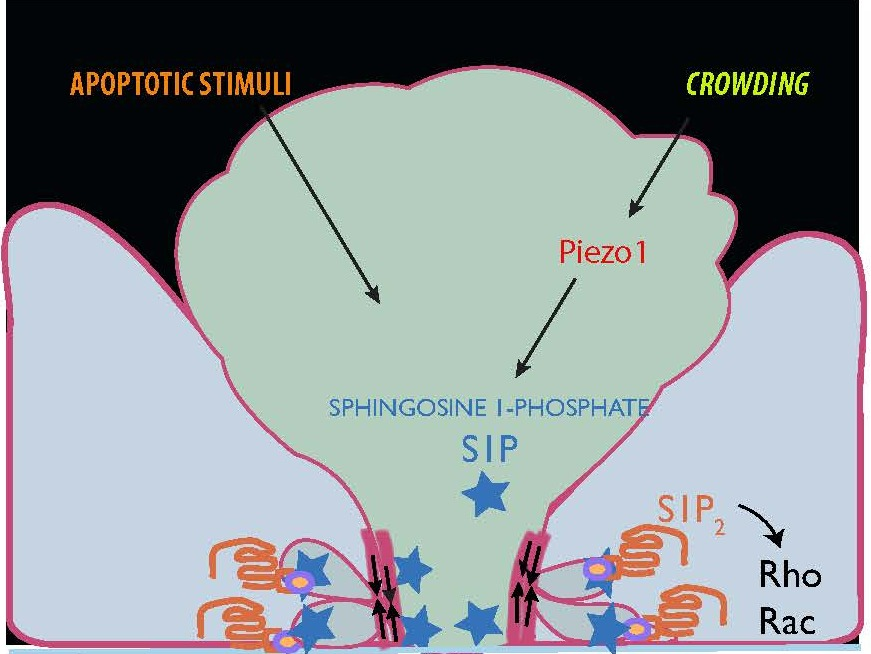
model of extrusion signaling

Cell extrusion, discovered in 2001 by Jody Rosenblatt, is a process conserved in epithelial from humans to sea sponge to seamlessly remove unwanted or dying cells while maintaining the integrity of the epithelial barrier. If cells were to die without extrusion, gaps would be created, compromising the epithelia's function. While cell targeted to die by apoptotic stimuli extrude to prevent gaps from forming, most cells die as a result of extruding live cells. To maintain epithelial cell number homeostasis, live cells extrude when they become too crowded.

== Function ==
Cell extrusion enables the removal of less fit and excess cells from the epithelia and endothelia. Apoptotic epithelial cell extrusion was first discovered as a way to prevent gaps when cell die within an epithelial layer. In vertebrates, most cells extrude out apically into the lumen, however, during fruit fly development, they extrude basally, back into the tissue the epithelia encase where they are engulfed.

During homeostasis, live cell extrusion drives most epithelial cell death when too many cells accumulate. To maintain constant cell numbers, crowding signals some cells to extrude, which then later die through anoikis, or death due to loss of survival signaling, derived from the underlying matrix. Live cell extrusion is essential for maintaining constant cell densities and preventing neoplasms, as its disruption causes masses to rapidly form.

== Triggers ==
Various factors such as apoptosis, overcrowding, pathogens and replicative stress can trigger extrusion from epithelia. Additionally, cells transformed with oncogenic mutations such as HRAS and Src can be ejected from epithelia by a similar extrusion process called Epithelial Defense Against Cancer (EDAC).

== Signaling controlling extrusion ==
The rate limiting step for all types of cell extrusion discovered thus far is the production of the bioactive lipid, Sphingosine 1-Phosphate (S1P), which then binds the G-protein-coupled receptor, S1P2 to trigger Rho-mediated actin and myosin contraction at the base of the cell, propelling the cell out apically. Trafficking of S1P to the basolateral plasma membrane requires microtubules, p115 RhoGEF and the plus-ended microtubule binding tumor suppressor Adenomatous Polyposis Coli (APC). While the S1P-S1P2-Rho-actin/myosin axis apparently controls all extrusions, this axis can be activated by different signaling, depending on the stimulus. Apoptotic extrusion may activate S1P simply through caspase activation. However, live cell extrusion is activated by crowding dependent activation of the stretch-activated cation channel Piezo1. Extrusion triggered by replicative stress or by cell competition requires p53 activation.

== Pathologies stemming from defective extrusion ==
=== Cancer ===
Disruption of extrusion not only leads to rapid formation of masses, a number of oncogenic mutations that drive aggressive cancers can hijack extrusion signaling in various ways to cause mass formation, disrupted barrier function, and aberrant Basal Cell Extrusion (BCE). While most cells extrude apically out of the epithelia organs encase, BCE drives cells in the opposite direction—basally, which can enable them to invade through the underlying stroma. Cells transformed with KRas, a driver of pancreatic, and some types of lung and colon cancer, have unregulated autophagy, which degrades S1P and prevents apical extrusion. Instead, cells form masses at sites where they would normally extrude and, at completely separate sites invade by BCE. Importantly, as they invade, BCE also causes the mechanical pinching off of their apical surfaces, which include epithelial determinants, thereby causing the cells to essentially partially de-differentiate. Thus, oncogenic transformation can cause cells to mechanically de-differentiate and invade by hijacking a process that normally drives cell death. Similarly, mutations in APC mis-target S1P, also causing BCE. Moreover, pancreatic cancers and some types of colon and lung cancer vastly down regulate S1P2. Rescue of S1P2 alone is sufficient to reduce orthotopic pancreatic cancer and metastases in a mouse model.

=== Asthma ===
Whereas too little extrusion can lead to cancer, too much can drive inflammatory disease. Typically crowding of 1.6-fold causes live cells to extrude during homeostatic turnover. When epithelia experience pathological crowding, as airway epithelial do during an asthma attack, they can extrude at such high rates that it destroys the barrier they should provide. This then mechanically causes the ensuing inflammation and hyper-susceptibility to infections that can follow an asthma attack. Because of this, blocking extrusion during an asthma attack may offer a new way to prevent this inflammatory period and potentially future attacks.
