= Jedi1 =

Names
- Preferred IUPAC name 2-methyl-5-phenylfuran-3-carboxylic acid

Identifiers
| CAS Number | 108124-17-0 |
| 3D model (JSmol) | Interactive image |
| ChEBI | CHEBI:194898 |
| ChEMBL | ChEMBL5208985 |
| ChemSpider | 643637 |
| EC Number | 673-051-5 |
| PubChem CID | 736516 |
| CompTox Dashboard (EPA) | DTXSID30353051 |
- InChI: InChI=1S/C12H10O3/c1-8-10(12(13)14)7-11(15-8)9-5-3-2-4-6-9/h2-7H,1H3,(H,13,14) Key: VLMNACSEESRUAK-UHFFFAOYSA-N
- SMILES: CC1=C(C=C(O1)C2=CC=CC=C2)C(=O)O

Properties
| Chemical formula | C_{12}H_{10}O_{3} |
| Molar mass | 202.209 g·mol^{−1} |

Hazards
- GHS labelling
| Pictograms | (GHS05: Corrosive) (GHS07: Exclamation mark) |
| Signal word | Warning |
| Hazard statements | H315, H319, H335 |
| Precautionary statements | P260, P264, P264+P265, P271, P280, P301+P330+P331, P302+P352, P302+P361+P354, P304+P340, P305+P351+P338, P305+P354+P338, P316, P319, P321, P332+P317, P337+P317, P362+P364, P363, P403+P233, P405, P501 |
- Except where otherwise noted, data are given for materials in their standard state (at 25 °C [77 °F], 100 kPa). Infobox references

Jedi1 (IUPAC name: 2-methyl-5-phenylfuran-3-carboxylic acid) is a chemical compound which acts as an agonist for the mechanosensitive ion channel PIEZO1, and is used in research into the function of touch perception.

== See also ==
- Yoda1 and Jedi2
