= Yoda1 =

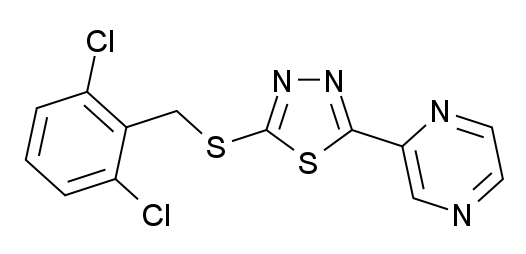

Names
- Preferred IUPAC name 2-(5-{[(2,6-Dichlorophenyl)methyl]sulfanyl}-1,3,4-thiadiazol-2-yl)pyrazine

Identifiers
CAS Number	448947-81-7
3D model (JSmol)	Interactive image
ChEBI	CHEBI:194079
ChEMBL	ChEMBL4303374
ChemSpider	2028293
EC Number	998-870-8
IUPHAR/BPS	9817
PubChem CID	2746822
UNII	TW6GF9RW6S
- InChI: InChI=1S/C13H8Cl2N4S2/c14-9-2-1-3-10(15)8(9)7-20-13-19-18-12(21-13)11-6-16-4-5-17-11/h1-6H,7H2 Key: BQNXBSYSQXSXPT-UHFFFAOYSA-N
- SMILES: ClC1=C(CSC2=NN=C(C3=NC=CN=C3)S2)C(Cl)=CC=C1

Properties
Chemical formula	C_{13}H_{8}Cl_{2}N_{4}S_{2}
Molar mass	355.27 g/mol

Hazards
- GHS labelling
Pictograms	(GHS07: Exclamation mark)
Signal word	Warning
Hazard statements	H302
Precautionary statements	P264, P270, P301+P317, P330, P501
- Except where otherwise noted, data are given for materials in their standard state (at 25 °C [77 °F], 100 kPa). Infobox references

Yoda1 is a chemical compound which is the first agonist developed for the mechanosensitive ion channel PIEZO1. This protein is involved in regulation of blood pressure and red blood cell volume, and Yoda1 is used in scientific research in these areas.

== See also ==
- Jedi1 and Jedi2
