= Lymphatic malformation 6 syndrome =

Genetic disorder

Lymphatic malformation 6 syndrome, also called generalized lymphatic dysplasia of Fotiou or PIEZO1 disease, is an autosomal recessive genetic disease caused by mutations in the PIEZO1 gene. It results in lymphedema in multiple different types of tissue. In utero, it causes nonimmune hydrops fetalis that may result in stillbirth. There is no association with neurologic symptoms including Intellectual disability or seizures. It was characterized genetically in 2015.
