= Jedi2 =

Names
- Preferred IUPAC name 2-methyl-5-thiophen-2-ylfuran-3-carboxylic acid

Identifiers
CAS Number	651005-90-2
3D model (JSmol)	Interactive image
ChEBI	CHEBI:194934
ChEMBL	ChEMBL5181053
ChemSpider	2074902
PubChem CID	2796026
UNII	7R2DP497ZL
CompTox Dashboard (EPA)	DTXSID90383819
- InChI: InChI=1S/C10H8O3S/c1-6-7(10(11)12)5-8(13-6)9-3-2-4-14-9/h2-5H,1H3,(H,11,12) Key: YXDCRSXNEOKXDE-UHFFFAOYSA-N
- SMILES: CC1=C(C=C(O1)C2=CC=CS2)C(=O)O

Properties
Chemical formula	C_{10}H_{8}O_{3}S
Molar mass	208.23 g·mol^{−1}

Hazards
- GHS labelling
Pictograms	(GHS07: Exclamation mark)
Signal word	Warning
Hazard statements	H302, H315, H317, H319
Precautionary statements	P261, P264, P264+P265, P270, P272, P280, P301+P317, P302+P352, P305+P351+P338, P321, P330, P333+P317, P337+P317, P362+P364, P501
- Except where otherwise noted, data are given for materials in their standard state (at 25 °C [77 °F], 100 kPa). Infobox references

Jedi2 is a chemical compound which acts as an agonist for the mechanosensitive ion channel PIEZO1, and is used in research into the function of touch perception.

== See also ==
- Yoda1 and Jedi1
