= PIEZO2 =

Mammalian protein found in Homo sapiens

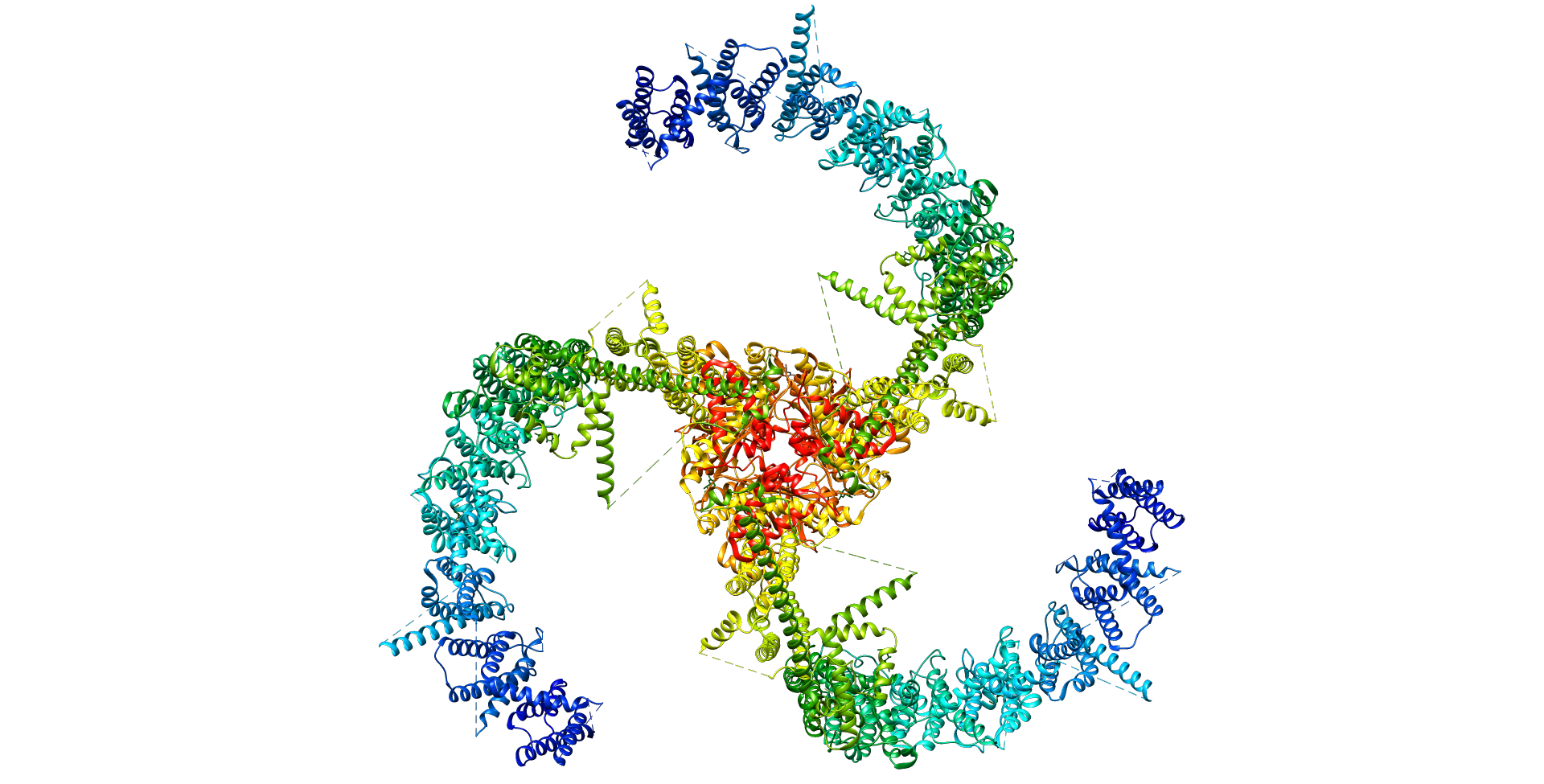

Identifiers
- Aliases: PIEZO2, C18orf30, C18orf58, DA3, DA5, FAM38B, FAM38B2, HsT748, HsT771, MWKS, piezo type mechanosensitive ion channel component 2, DAIPT
- External IDs: OMIM: 613629; MGI: 1918781; GeneCards: PIEZO2
Available structures
| PDB | Ortholog search: PDBe RCSB |
| PDB | List of PDB id codes 6KG7 |

Gene location (Human)
| Chr. | Chromosome 18 (human) |
| Band | 18p11.22-p11.21 | Start | 10,666,483 bp |
| Band | 18p11.22-p11.21 | End | 11,149,569 bp |

Gene location (Mouse)
| Chr. | Chromosome 18 (mouse) |
| Band | 18|18 E1 | Start | 63,143,284 bp |
| Band | 18|18 E1 | End | 63,520,254 bp |
RNA expression pattern
| Bgee | Human / Mouse (ortholog); Top expressed in: sural nerve; corpus callosum; spinal ganglia; visceral pleura; inferior ganglion of vagus nerve; trigeminal ganglion; parietal pleura; optic nerve; C1 segment; Achilles tendon / Top expressed in: lumbar spinal ganglion; prostate; lobe of prostate; cumulus cell; trigeminal ganglion; genital tubercle; hand; aortic valve; ascending aorta; gastrula; More reference expression data |
| BioGPS | n/a |
Gene ontology
| Molecular function | cation channel activity; mechanosensitive ion channel activity |
| Cellular component | membrane; integral component of membrane; plasma membrane |
| Biological process | ion transmembrane transport; response to mechanical stimulus; ion transport; response to stimulus; cation transport; detection of mechanical stimulus involved in sensory perception; regulation of membrane potential; detection of mechanical stimulus; cellular response to mechanical stimulus; cation transmembrane transport; transmembrane transport |
Sources:Amigo / QuickGO
Orthologs
| Databases | NCBI: entry; OMA: entry |
| Species | Human | Mouse |
| Entrez | 63895 | 667742 |
| Ensembl | ENSG00000154864 | ENSMUSG00000041482 |
| UniProt | Q9H5I5 | Q8CD54 |
| RefSeq (mRNA) | NM_022068; NM_173817; NM_001378183 | NM_001039485; NM_172629 |
| RefSeq (protein) | NP_071351; NP_001365112 | NP_001034574 |
| Location (UCSC) | Chr 18: 10.67 – 11.15 Mb | Chr 18: 63.14 – 63.52 Mb |
| PubMed search |
- Wikidata
| View/Edit Human | View/Edit Mouse |

Piezo-type mechanosensitive ion channel component 2 is a protein that in humans is encoded by the PIEZO2 gene. The PIEZO2 protein has a role in mechanotransduction. Mechanical activation of the channel leads to depolarization of the plasma membrane or activation of secondary messenger cascades. PIEZO2 was cloned in 2010 after its homolog, PIEZO1, was identified using small interfering RNAs of candidate genes for mechanically activated ion channels in mouse neurons. It has a homotrimeric structure, with three blades curving into a nano-dome, with a diameter of 28 nanometers (nm). 'Piezo' comes from the Greek 'piesi,' meaning 'pressure.'

== Structure ==
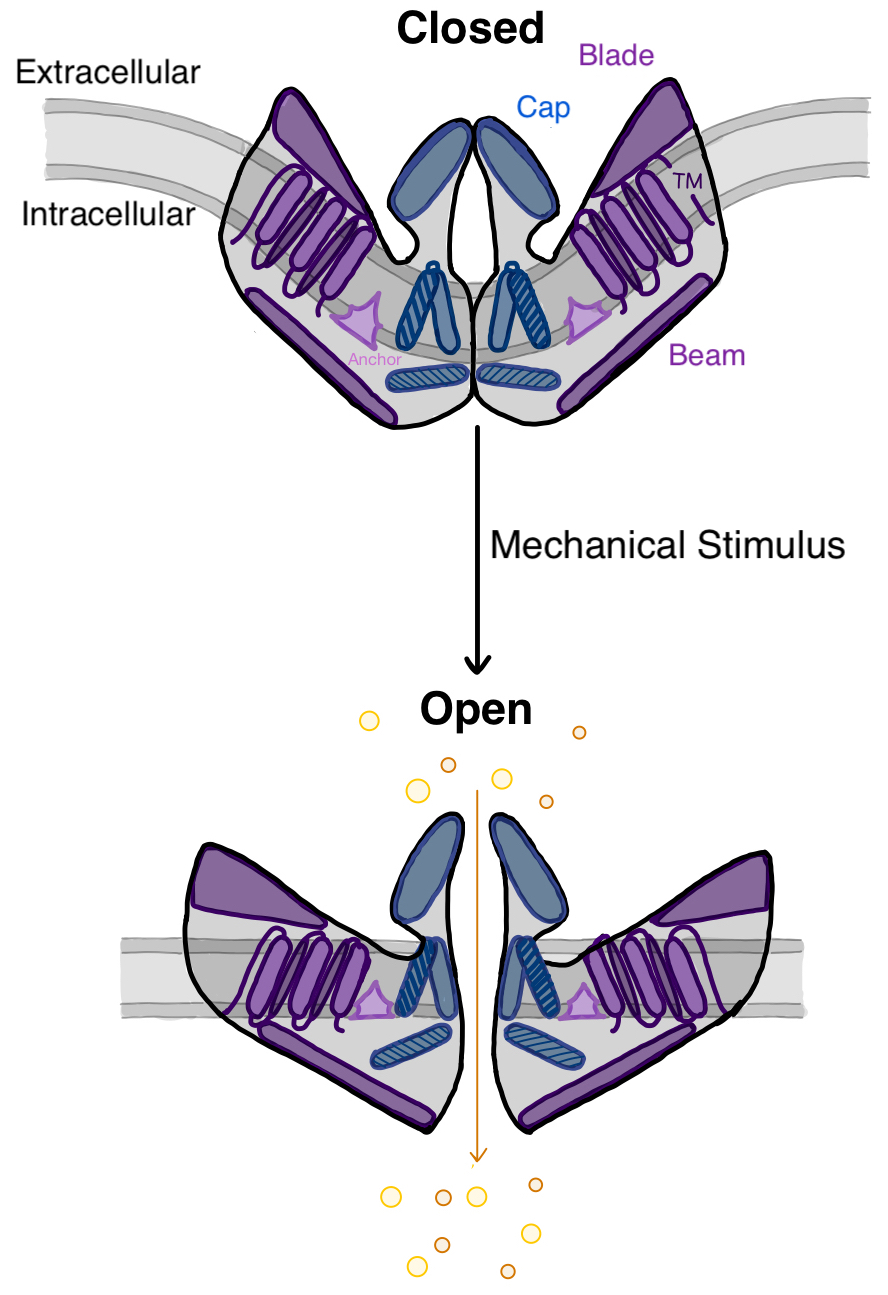
Diagram demonstrating structural components of the PIEZO2 complex, the nano-dome shape in the closed state, and how mechanical stimuli open the channel to allow ion flow.

Piezos are large transmembrane proteins conserved among various species, but they don't have known sequence similarity to any other class of proteins. Piezo proteins contain around 2500-2800 amino acids depending on the species. The structure of piezo proteins has been determined using cryo-electron microscopy. They have a homotrimeric propellor-like structure composed on three blades curved into a nano-dome with a diameter of 28 nm and axial height of 17 nm. The three monomers meet in the center to form a ion-conducting pore across the membrane. A cap-like domain sits on the extracellular side of the pore and may play a role in regulating ion flow. Each monomer of PIEZO2 has 38 transmembrane domains which is the most for any known protein in humans. 36 of these domains are located on the blade and every four form a repeated structure called a transmembrane helical unit or piezo repeat. The blades form a nano-dome shape which deform the local curvature of the membrane. Under lateral tension from the lipids and changes to the local curvature of the membrane, the dome can be reversibly flattened which is how it is proposed to detect mechanical stimuli. A 540 amino acid intracellular loop contains the latch, clasp, and beam domains of PIEZO2. The beam domain is 9 nm long and connects the blades with central pore region near the anchor region.

== Function ==
=== Molecular function ===
PIEZO2 is a mechanically activated cation channel. PIEZO2 produces an excitatory current by nonselective conduction of cations through the central pore, slightly preferring calcium. The influx of cations depolarizes the plasma membrane and can activate secondary messenger cascades. PIEZO2-mediated currents are responsive to both poke and stretch stimuli as measured by patch clamp electrophysiology. PIEZO2 channels inactivate faster than PIEZO1 channels and can inactivate under continued mechanical stimulus. PIEZO2 has a single channel conductance between 20-30 picosiemens.

=== Physiological function ===
PIEZO2 has been implicated in a variety of physiological mechanoreceptive functions including touch, proprioception, nociception, and interoception. PIEZO2 is expressed in sensory tissue such as sensory ganglia and epithelial cells in the bladder, colon, lungs, and stomach. For example, PIEZO2 is found in cell types that respond to physical touch, such as Merkel cells, and is thought to regulate light touch response. In the gastrointestinal tract, PIEZO2 is expressed in enteroendocrine cells, where it can signal intestinal stretch and is involved in the release of neurotransmitters and hormones. PIEZO2 is expressed in the neuroepithelial cells of the lungs where it can sense the pressure in the respiratory tract and play a role in the regulation of breathing. In the urinary system, PIEZO2 is the primary mechanoreceptor for innervation of the bladder at low pressures. Along with PIEZO1, PIEZO2 plays a role regulating blood pressure through the baroreflex. It also plays role in skeletal and cartilage development and homeostasis, such as by detecting compression of chondrocytes.

== Pathology ==
- Gain-of-function mutations in the mechanically activated ion channel PIEZO2 cause a subtype of Distal Arthrogryposis.
- Mice without PIEZO2 in their proprioceptive neurons show uncoordinated body movements, indicating that PIEZO2 plays a role in mammalian proprioception.
- PIEZO2 mutations link Gordon syndrome (distal arthrogryposis type 3), Marden-Walker syndrome and Arthrogryposis (Distal Arthrogryposis Type 5).
- Loss of function mutations result in severe loss of proprioception, insensitivity to touch and vibration, perinatal respiratory distress, and motor and skeletal abnormalities.

== See also ==
- PIEZO1
