= PIEZO1 =

Protein-coding gene in the species Homo sapiens

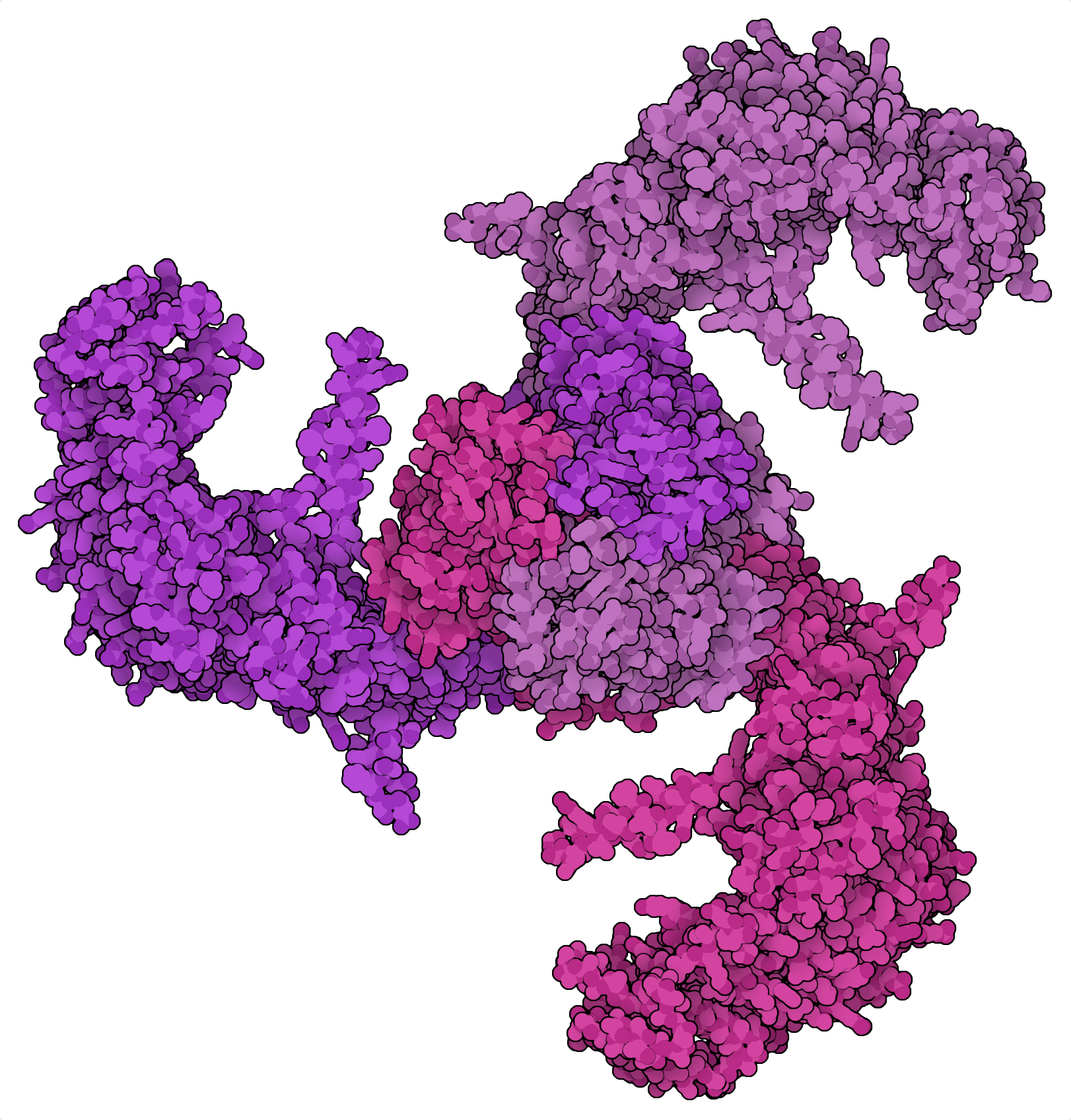

Identifiers
- Aliases: PIEZO1, DHS, FAM38A, Mib, LMPH3, piezo type mechanosensitive ion channel component 1, LMPHM6
- External IDs: OMIM: 611184; MGI: 3603204; GeneCards: PIEZO1

Gene location (Human)
Chr.	Chromosome 16 (human)
Band	16q24.3	Start	88,715,338 bp
Band	16q24.3	End	88,785,220 bp

Gene location (Mouse)
Chr.	Chromosome 8 (mouse)
Band	8|8 E1	Start	123,208,437 bp
Band	8|8 E1	End	123,278,068 bp
RNA expression pattern
Bgee	Human / Mouse (ortholog); Top expressed in: muscle layer of sigmoid colon; upper lobe of left lung; granulocyte; spleen; subcutaneous adipose tissue; right lung; prostate; gastric mucosa; skin of leg; left uterine tube / Top expressed in: endothelial cell of lymphatic vessel; vestibular membrane of cochlear duct; internal carotid artery; external carotid artery; stroma of bone marrow; otic vesicle; iris; ciliary body; medullary collecting duct; calvaria; More reference expression data
BioGPS	n/a
Gene ontology
Molecular function	cation channel activity; mechanosensitive ion channel activity
Cellular component	integral component of membrane; cell projection; endoplasmic reticulum-Golgi intermediate compartment membrane; endoplasmic reticulum membrane; endoplasmic reticulum; lamellipodium membrane; membrane; plasma membrane
Biological process	ion transmembrane transport; positive regulation of cell-cell adhesion mediated by integrin; cation transport; positive regulation of integrin activation; ion transport; cation transmembrane transport; regulation of membrane potential; detection of mechanical stimulus; cellular response to mechanical stimulus; transmembrane transport
Sources:Amigo / QuickGO
Orthologs
Databases	NCBI: entry; OMA: entry
Species	Human	Mouse
Entrez	9780	234839
Ensembl	ENSG00000103335	ENSMUSG00000014444
UniProt	Q92508	E2JF22
RefSeq (mRNA)	NM_001142864	NM_001037298; NM_001357349
RefSeq (protein)	NP_001136336	n/a
Location (UCSC)	Chr 16: 88.72 – 88.79 Mb	Chr 8: 123.21 – 123.28 Mb
PubMed search
- Wikidata
View/Edit Human	View/Edit Mouse

Piezo-type mechanosensitive ion channel component 1 is a protein that in humans is encoded by the PIEZO1 gene. PIEZO1 is a large mechanosensitive ion channel protein that forms a homotrimeric complex with a distinctive three-bladed, propeller-shaped architecture. Each subunit of PIEZO1 contains between 30 and 40 transmembrane domains. The protein consists of a central pore module and peripheral mechanotransduction modules. The pore module is composed of the last two transmembrane helices, an extracellular cap domain, and an intracellular C-terminal domain.

PIEZO1 functions as a non-selective cation channel capable of conducting both monovalent and divalent cations, including Na^{+}, K^{+}, and Ca^{2+}. The mechanosensitivity of PIEZO1 is a defining characteristic. It can be directly activated by membrane tension, with the peripheral blade and beam structures likely acting as mechanotransduction modules. Notably, PIEZO1 requires lower tension for activation compared to bacterial mechanosensitive channels. The protein exhibits voltage-dependent inactivation. PIEZO1 serves as a mechanotransducer in various cell types and tissues playing roles in processes such as vascular development, red blood cell volume regulation, and epithelial homeostasis.

Piezo1 and its close homolog Piezo2 were cloned in 2010, using an siRNA-based screen for mechanosensitive ion channels.

== Structure ==
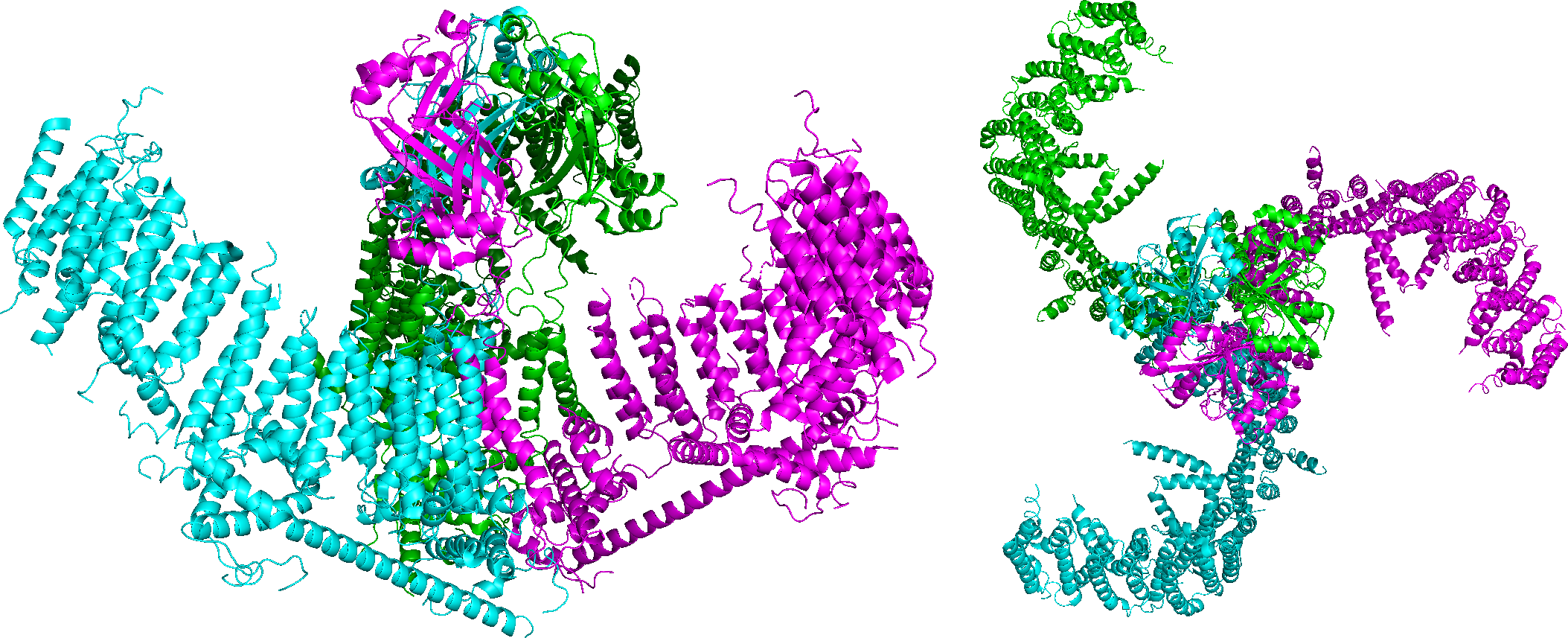
Image of PIEZO1 homotrimer (left: from the side, right: from the top) from PDB: 5Z10.

Piezo1 (this gene) and Piezo2 share 47% identity with each other and they have no similarity to any other protein, making them unique among ion channels. They are predicted to have 24-36 transmembrane domains, depending on the prediction algorithm used. In the original publication the authors were careful not to call the piezo proteins ion channels, but a more recent study by the same lab convincingly demonstrated that indeed Piezo1 is the pore-forming subunit of a mechanosensitive channel. This new "Piezo" family is catalogued as InterPro: IPR027272 and TCDB 1.A.75. Piezo1 homologues are found in C. elegans and Drosophila, which, like other invertebrates, have a single Piezo protein.

It is known (PDB: 6B3R) that Piezo1 channel is a three-bladed propeller-like structure, or trimer, with unique membrane curvature. When activated, a lever-like mechanogating mechanism is assumed for the flexible blades, opening the central pore to allow for the influx of calcium ions. Typically, this is in response to mechanical tension and ultimately leads to the triggering of downstream signaling pathways. As such, Piezo1 activation is essential to transduction of biochemical signals.

== Function ==
=== Cell volume regulation ===
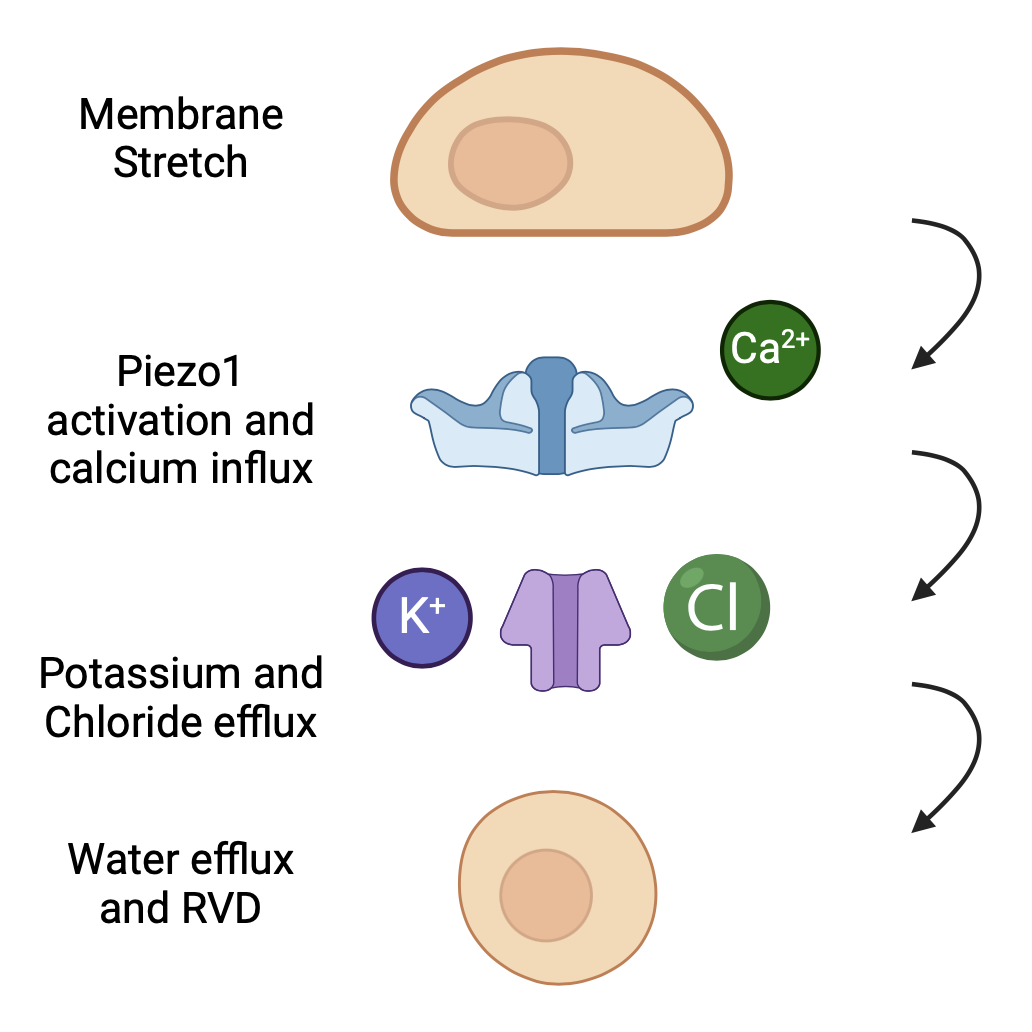
Regulatory Volume Decrease by Piezo1 made with BioRender

Mechanotransduction refers to cellular responses that arise from the conversion of mechanical stimuli. Piezo1 plays a critical role in maintaining cell volume, especially under osmotic stress. It senses membrane stretches after swelling due to hypotonic conditions and mediates calcium-dependent activation of volume-regulated anion channels (VRACs) and Kca channels, initiating a process known as regulatory volume decrease (RVD) to help cells recover their original size. Potassium and chloride ions are expelled in this process to restore osmotic balance, creating a gradient that encourages water to move out of the cell. This prevents cellular damage from prolonged swelling and is particularly important for cellular homeostasis, as Piezo1 modulates the ionic efflux and water movement. This mechanism is highlighted in erythrocytes, where volume changes in narrow capillaries can lead to hemolysis. Piezo1 activation supports the structural integrity and adaptation of these cells to maintain efficient oxygen transport.

=== Cell cycle regulation and migration ===
The influx of calcium ions induces changes in membrane potential and intracellular ion concentration, leading to a cascade of signaling pathways. These activate calcium-dependent kinases and cascades like the ERK1/2 branch of the mitogen-activated protein kinase (MAPK) pathway. The MAPK pathway is well characterized and plays a role in regulating a variety of cellular processes. In the ERK1/2 branch, Piezo1-mediated calcium influx phosphorylates downstream targets, regulating gene expression and cell cycle progression, especially in periodontal ligament cells (PDLCs) where tissue remodeling is prominent.

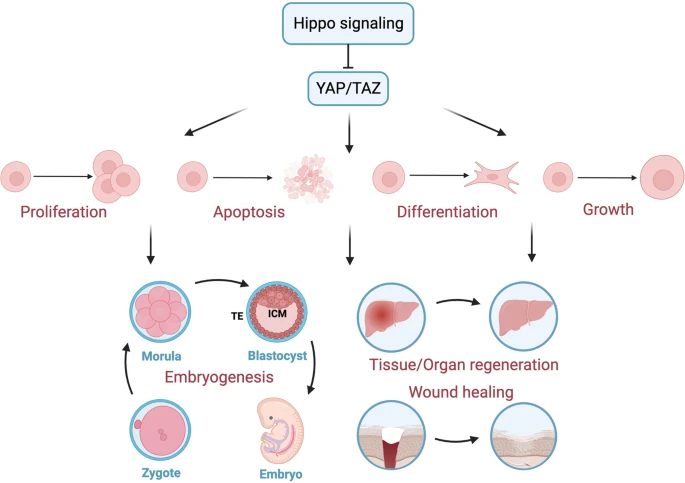
Hippo/Yap Function

In dorsal root ganglia (DRG), Piezo1 enables cells to detect substrate stiffness and modulate behavior through the calpain-integrin-E-cadherin pathway. Beginning with the activation of calpain, a protease that modulates the cytoskeleton and E-cadherin, this pathway affects integrin B1, a receptor of extracellular matrix proteins. Piezo1 signaling ensures the proper localization to facilitate cell-matrix adhesion, cellular aggregation, and balance between proliferation with apoptosis. In endothelial cells, this homeostasis supports vascular development because integrins are crucial for angiogenesis.

Additionally, Piezo1 can affect the Hippo/YAP pathway, which controls cell proliferation and differentiation, underscoring Piezo1's role in cellular metastasis. In ovarian cancer, Piezo1 facilitates nuclear translocation of YAP and promotes the epithelial-to-mesenchymal transition (EMT), which leads to acquisition of invasive characteristics and is a hallmark of cancer metastasis. The promotion of EMT enhances the migratory capabilities of cancer cells. With this knowledge, further research is needed to investigate the inhibition of tumor progression that therapeutic targeting potentially offers.

== Regulation ==
=== Conformational signaling ===
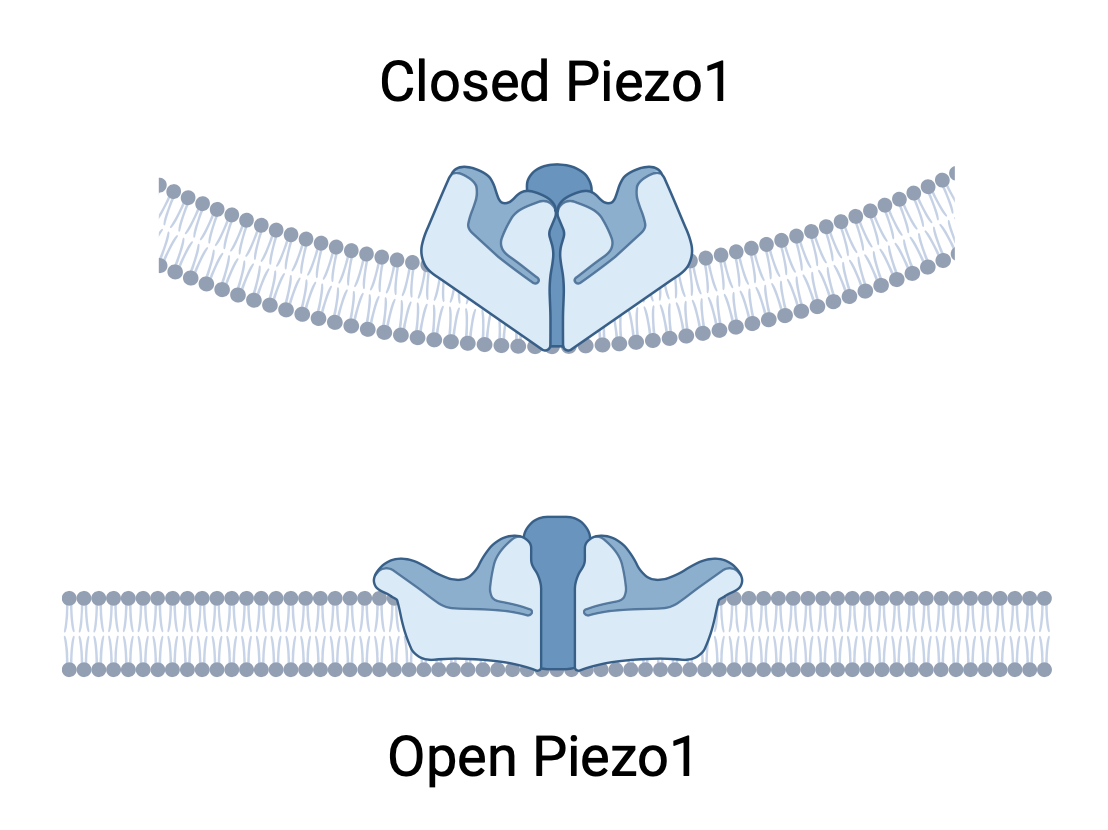
Membrane Curvature in Different States of Piezo1 (made with BioRender)

Piezo1 also engages in conformational signaling and influences nearby proteins due to changes in its membrane curvature. The influence extends tens of nanometers from Piezo1, affecting the surrounding lipid bilayer. This mechanism is independent from direct protein interaction, but is still critical in modulating local ion channels and signaling cascades. Interactions with TREK1 potassium channels are a prime example of this relationship. TREK1 is a two-pore channel that similarly responds to mechanical stimuli. Activation of Piezo1 enhances TREK1 activity through modulating its gating properties with greater amplitude and prolonged activation state, even in the absence of ion flow through Piezo1. Research has found that these do not colocalize, meaning there are no direct physical interactions between them.

=== Feedback mechanisms ===
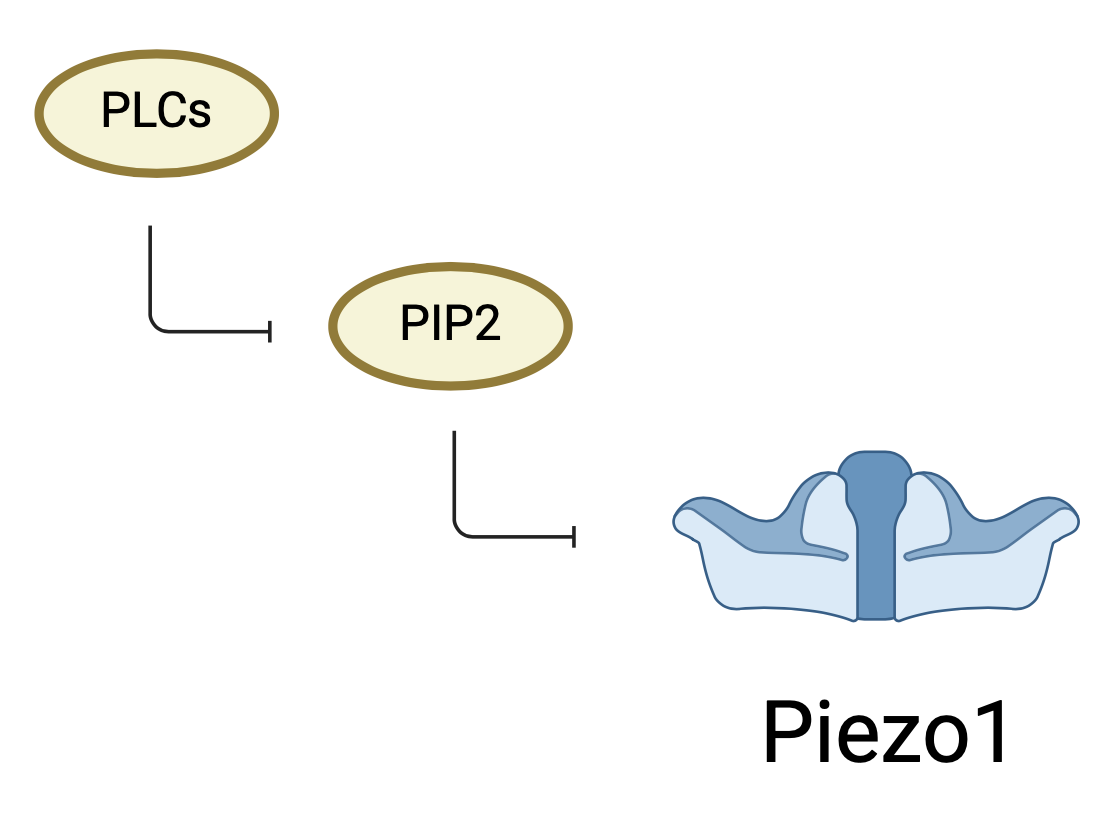
Self-Limiting Mechanism of Piezo1 (made with BioRender)

Increased intracellular calcium also activates phospholipase C (PLC), in turn hydrolyzing PIP2. The hydrolysis of PIP2 directly affects Piezo1 activity. A self-limiting mechanism of Piezo1 is activity reduction caused by depletion of PIP2 in the membrane. This ensures that Piezo1 does not remain excessively active.

== Tissue distribution ==
Piezo1 is expressed in the lungs, bladder and skin, where mechanosensation has important biological roles. Unlike Piezo2 which is highly expressed in sensory dorsal root ganglia, Piezo1 is not expressed in sensory neurons. Consequently Piezo1 plays a significant role in multiple neurobiological processes including axon regeneration, neural stem cells differentiation and neurological diseases progression.

Piezo1 is also expressed in immune cells, including lymphocytes and myeloid cells, and has been shown to have a role in the function of fundamental immune processes, like antigen presentation and phagocytosis.

Levels of Piezo1 mRNA have been shown to be increased by mechanical stimulation, such as vibration at 1,000 Hz in monocytes.

== Clinical significance ==
Piezo1 is also found in red blood cells, and gain of function mutations in the channels are associated with hereditary xerocytosis or stomatocytosis. Piezo1 channels are pivotal integrators in vascular biology.

An allele of Piezo1, E756del, results in a gain-of-function mutation, resulting in dehydrated RBCs and conveying resistance to Plasmodium. This allele has been demonstrated in vitro to prevent cerebral malaria infection.

Piezo1 has been implicated in extrusion of epidermal cells when a layer becomes too confluent to preserve normal skin homeostasis. This acts to prevent excess proliferation of skin tissue, and has been implicated in cancer biology as a contributing factor to metastases by assisting living cells in escaping from a monolayer.

Expression of murine Piezo1 in mouse innate immune cells is essential for their function, a role mediated by sensing mechanical cues. Deficiency in Piezo1 in mice lead to increased susceptibility of myeloid cells to infection by Pseudomonas aeruginosa.

Lymphatic malformation 6 syndrome is caused by mutations in Piezo1 and was characterized in 2015.

Piezo1 has been proposed as a therapeutic target for Alzheimer's disease. The build-up of amyloid-β plaques stiffen the brain's structure. Microglial maintenance cells, which express Piezo1, detect this stiffness via Piezo1-enabled mechanosensation and in response surround, compact, and phagocytosize the plaques. Removal of the gene which codes for Piezo1 in microglia decreases plaque clearance and hastens cognitive decline in rats.

== Ligands ==
Agonists

- Jedi1/2
- Yoda1 (small molecule agonist)

Antagonists

- Streptomycin
- Ruthenium Red
- GsMTx4
- Dooku1
