= Discovery and development of bisphosphonates =

Drugs used to treat bone disorders

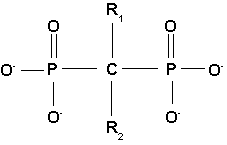
Chemical structure of bisphosphonates

Bisphosphonates are an important class of drugs originally commercialised in the mid to late 20th century. They are used for the treatment of osteoporosis and other bone disorders that cause bone fragility and diseases where bone resorption is excessive. Osteoporosis is common in post-menopausal women and patients in corticosteroid treatment where biphosphonates have been proven a valuable treatment and also used successfully against Paget's disease, myeloma, bone metastases and hypercalcemia. Bisphosphonates reduce breakdown of bones by inhibiting osteoclasts, they have a long history of use and today there are a few different types of bisphosphonate drugs on the market around the world.

== Discovery ==
Bisphosphonates were originally synthesized in the 19th century and used in industry for their antiscaling and anticorrosive properties. In the late 1960s their potential to treat diseases related to the metabolism of the bones became evident. The first generation of bisphosphonates included etidronic acid and clodronic acid which were introduced in the 1970s and 1980s. They were the first bisphosphonate drugs to be used successfully in the clinic. They have since then been developed further with the intention to make them more potent, enhance their distribution inside the bone and extend the duration of action. This has made it possible to give zoledronate, the most recent bisphosphonate drug to be placed on the market, in a single annual dose by intravenous infusion.

== Development ==
The original bisphosphonates (first generation) were simple molecules with small groups of single atoms or alkyl chains in position R_{1} and R_{2}. They only had a rather weak inhibiting effect on bone resorption. The inclusion of an amino group marked the beginning of the second generation of bisphosphonates with higher potency. The first was pamidronate and similar analogues followed where the position of the nitrogen in the side chain was the key to a more potent drug. Later it became apparent that the nitrogen does not necessarily have to be connected to an alkyl chain but instead using a heterocyclic group. A few such drugs have been developed and placed on the market where zoledronate is the most notable one. Minodronic acid is even more potent and has been placed on the market in Japan. Their potency is such that it is effective even in picomolar concentration.

Further development has not resulted in the placing on the market of compounds in equal potency. Arylalkyl substitutes of pamidronate are among the most recent bisphosphonates to be used clinically where the hydroxyl group in position R_{2} has been omitted to ensure stability.

Recent research in this area has opened up an opportunity to develop new bisphosphonate drug therapies.

Bisphosphonates with a more lipophilic character have been developed and have shown potential as a tumor suppressant. They operate by a slightly different mechanism in which they not only inhibit the key enzyme farnesyl pyrophosphate synthase (FPPS) of the mevalonate pathway but also geranylgeranyl pyrophosphate synthase (GGPS), an enzyme also located in the mevalonate pathway. They do not have the same affinity for the bone minerals.

GGPS has since been successfully inhibited by a novel bisphosphonate compound with a triazole group within R_{2} and a methyl group in R_{1}. This may become useful in therapies against malignancies like multiple myeloma.

In 2018, a dendritic bisphosphonate was introduced containing three bisphosphonate units. It has shown potential for bone specific delivery of large therapeutic molecules by taking advantage of the high affinity of bisphosphonates to the bone minerals

== Mechanism of action ==
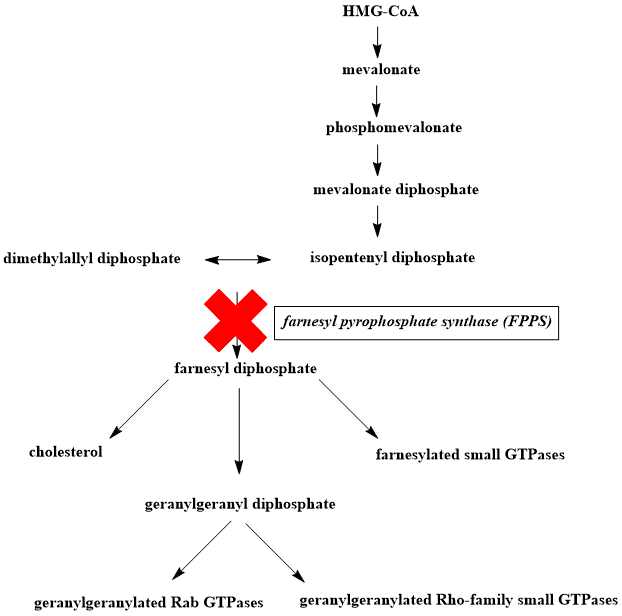
Bisphosphonates inhibit the enzyme FPPS of the mevalonate pathway and prevent the biosynthesis of isoprenoid lipids and eventually the post-translational modifications of osteoclasts.

The mechanism of action of the bisphosphonates (BP's) has evolved as new generations of drugs have been developed. The function of the first generation bisphosphonates differs from the more recent nitrogen containing BP's but both are apparently internalised by endocytosis of a membrane-bound vesicle where the drug is most likely in a complex with Ca^{2+} ions. This does not concern other cells in the bone as this takes place by a selective uptake of osteoclasts.

The common function which applies to all bisphosphonate drugs is a physicochemical interaction with the bone mineral to prevent the physical resorption of the bone by the osteoclasts. This is especially relevant at sites where bone remodelling is most active. The bisphosphonates have an intrinsic affinity for the calcium ions (hydroxyapatite) of the bone mineral just as the endogenous pyrophosphates. The difference lies in the non-hydrolysable carbon-phosphorus bond of the bisphosphonates which prevents their metabolism and at the same time ensure an effective absorption from the gastrointestinal tract.

The primary inhibiting action of the first generation of bisphosphonates on osteoclasts is by inducing apoptosis. The mechanism of action is apparently by the formation of an ATP analogue or metabolite of the bisphosphonates like etidronic acid and clodronic acid. The ATP analogue accumulates in the cytosol of the osteoclast with a cytotoxic effect.

The primary mechanism of action of the more developed nitrogen containing bisphosphonates is however by cellular effects on osteoclasts through inhibition of the mevalonate pathway and in particular the subsequent formation of isoprenoid lipids. The inhibition takes place at a key branch point in the pathway catalyzed by farnesyl pyrophosphate synthase (FPPS). Isoprenoid lipids are necessary for post-translational modifications of small GTP-binding regulatory proteins like Rac, Rho and Ras of the Ras superfamily. The function of osteoclasts depends on them for a variety of cellular processes like apoptosis.

== Structure activity relationship ==
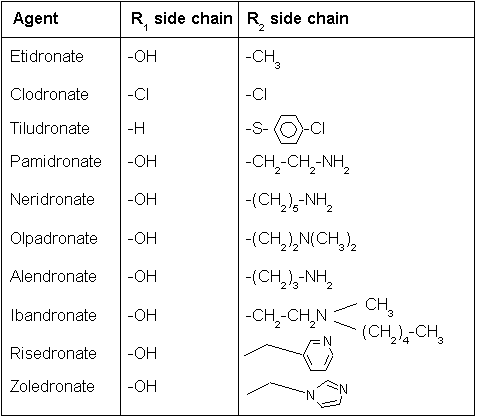
Bisphosphonate drugs and structure of the two side chains

=== Pharmacophore ===
Bisphosphonates mimic the endogenous inorganic pyrophosphate where the oxygen backbone is replaced with carbon (P-C-P for P-O-P). The two additional groups or side chains on the carbon backbone are usually referred to as R_{1} and R_{2}. R_{1} is usually a hydroxyl group which enhances the affinity for the calcium by forming a tridentate ligand along with the phosphate groups. The compound can be made more potent by optimizing the structure of the R_{2} group to best inhibit bone resorption.

=== Phosphonate ===
Phosphonate groups in the chemical structure are important for the binding of the drug to the target enzyme. Studies have shown that removal or replacement of the phosphonate group with a carboxylic acid causes drastic loss in potency of the drug and the enzyme inhibitor no longer goes into an isomerized state.

=== Hydroxyl group (R_{1} side chain) ===
Modification of the R_{1} side chain on bisphosphonates is very minor today, single hydroxyl group at that position seems to give the best results in terms of activity. The hydroxyl group plays a role in forming a water-induced bond with glutamine (Gln240) on the target enzyme. Drugs that have no hydroxyl group initially cause better inhibition than parent compounds, without hydroxyl group the drug seems to fit more easily into the open active site. The absence of hydroxyl group however reduces the ability to hold the target enzyme complex in isomerized state. Biological activity of bisphosphonates with hydroxyl group, therefore, appears over longer time.

=== Nitrogen (R_{2} side chain) ===
Nitrogen containing bisphosphonates are the current most used drugs in the class because of their potency. Studies have shown that nitrogen on bisphosphonates forms hydrogen bond with threonine (Thr201) and the carbonyl part of Lysine (Lys200) on target enzyme, therefore enhancing the binding of the complex. Altering the position of nitrogen can significantly change the ability for the nitrogen hydrogen bond to occur.

Relative potency of nitrogen containing bisphosphonates
Bisphosphonate	potency (relative)
Alendronate	1-5
Risedronate	10
Zoledronate (IV)	50

=== Modification of nitrogen containing side chain (R_{2} side chain) ===
Increased carbon length of the nitrogen R_{2} side chain alters activity. Side chain that is made out of three carbons has proven to be the most ideal length in terms of activity, increasing or decreasing the length of the chain from there has negative effect on biological activity. Alendronate, a common bisphosphonate drug, has a three carbon length side chain for example. Risedronate has heterocyclic structure containing nitrogen. Heterocyclic nitrogen containing bisphosphonates have revealed better results in terms of activity compared to earlier bisphosphonates with nitrogen bound to carbon chain. Studies on risedronate analogous with different placement of nitrogen on the ring have shown no measurable difference on biological activity. Increased length of carbon chain connected to the ring revealed negative results. Zoledronate is the most potent bisphosphonate drug today only available as intravenous injection. It is the only bisphosphonate drug that has two nitrogen groups in the side chain hence its potency and route of administration differs from other drugs in the same class.
