= Alendronic acid/colecalciferol =

Drug combination used to manage osteoporosis

Combination of
- Alendronic acid: Bisphosphonate
- Colecalciferol: Vitamin

Clinical data
- Trade names: Fosamax Plus D, Fosavance, Adrovance, others
- AHFS/Drugs.com: Monograph
- License data: US DailyMed: Fosamax Plus D
- Pregnancy category: AU: B3
- Routes of administration: By mouth
- ATC code: M05BB03 (WHO)

Legal status
- Legal status: CA: ℞-only; UK: POM (Prescription only); US: ℞-only; EU: Rx-only; In general: ℞ (Prescription only)

Identifiers
- CAS Number: 1215291-18-1
- KEGG: D10841

Alendronic acid/colecalciferol, sold under the brand name Fosamax Plus D among others, is a medication for the treatment of osteoporosis in men or in postmenopausal women.

Alendronic acid/colecalciferol was approved for use in the United States and in the European Union in 2005.
