= Ibandronic acid =

Chemical compound

Clinical data
- Trade names: Boniva, Bonviva, Bondronat, others
- AHFS/Drugs.com: Monograph
- License data: EU EMA: by INN; US DailyMed: Ibandronate_sodium; US FDA: Ibandronate_sodium
- Pregnancy category: AU: B3
- Routes of administration: By mouth, intravenous
- ATC code: M05BA06 (WHO)

Legal status
- Legal status: US: ℞-only; EU: Rx-only; In general: ℞ (Prescription only)

Pharmacokinetic data
- Bioavailability: 0.6%
- Protein binding: 90.9 to 99.5% (concentration-dependent)
- Metabolism: Nil
- Elimination half-life: 10 to 60 hours
- Excretion: Kidney

Identifiers
- IUPAC name: Hydroxy-[1-hydroxy-3-[methyl(pentyl)amino]-1-phosphonopropyl]phosphinate
- CAS Number: 114084-78-5
- PubChem CID: 60852
- IUPHAR/BPS: 3059
- DrugBank: DB00710
- ChemSpider: 54839
- UNII: UMD7G2653W
- KEGG: D08056; as salt: D04486
- ChEBI: CHEBI:93770
- ChEMBL: ChEMBL997
- PDB ligand: BFQ (PDBe, RCSB PDB)
- CompTox Dashboard (EPA): DTXSID5048340
- ECHA InfoCard: 100.214.537

Chemical and physical data
- Formula: C_{9}H_{23}NO_{7}P_{2}
- Molar mass: 319.231 g·mol^{−1}
- 3D model (JSmol): Interactive image
- SMILES: O=P(O)(O)C(O)(CCN(CCCCC)C)P(=O)(O)O
- InChI: InChI=1S/C9H23NO7P2/c1-3-4-5-7-10(2)8-6-9(11,18(12,13)14)19(15,16)17/h11H,3-8H2,1-2H3,(H2,12,13,14)(H2,15,16,17); Key:MPBVHIBUJCELCL-UHFFFAOYSA-N

Ibandronic acid is a bisphosphonate medication used in the prevention and treatment of osteoporosis and metastasis-associated skeletal fractures in people with cancer. It may also be used to treat hypercalcemia (elevated blood calcium levels). It is typically formulated as its sodium salt ibandronate sodium.

Ibandronate, or ibandronic acid, is primarily used to prevent and treat postmenopausal osteoporosis in women. Its U.S. brand name is Boniva, and in contrast to most other bisphosphonate drugs, Ibandronate can be administered both orally and intravenously.

It was patented in 1986 by Boehringer Mannheim and approved for medical use in 1996.

== Medical uses ==
Ibandronate is indicated for the treatment and prevention of osteoporosis in post-menopausal women. In May 2003, the US Food and Drug Administration (FDA) approved ibandronate as a daily treatment for post-menopausal osteoporosis. The basis for this approval was a three-year, randomized, double-blind, placebo-controlled trial women with post-menopausal osteoporosis. Each participant also received daily oral doses of calcium and 400IUs [international units] of vitamin D. At the study's conclusion, both doses significantly reduced the occurrence risk of new vertebral fractures by 50–52 percent when compared to the effects of the placebo drug.

Ibandronate is efficacious for the prevention of metastasis-related bone fractures in multiple myeloma, breast cancer, and certain other cancers.

== Adverse effects ==
In 2008, the US Food and Drug Administration (FDA) issued a communication warning of the possibility of severe and sometimes incapacitating bone, joint or muscle pain. A study conducted by the American Society of Bone and Mineral Research concluded that long-term use of bisphosphonates, including Boniva, may increase the risk of a rare but serious fracture of the femur. The drug also has been associated with osteonecrosis of the jaw, a relatively rare but serious condition.

== Pharmacology ==
=== Mechanism of action ===
Nitrogen containing bisphosphonates, which include ibandronate, pamidronate and alendronate exert their effects on osteoclasts mainly by inhibiting the synthesis of isoprenoid lipids such as isopentenyl diphosphate (IPP), farnesyl diphosphate (FPP), and geranylgeranyl diphosphate (GGPP) via the mevalonate pathway. These isoprenoids are used in posttranslational modification (prenylation) of small GTPases such as Ras, Rho, and Rac. These prenylated GTPases are necessary for various cellular processes including osteoclast morphology, endosome trafficking, and apoptosis.

Relative potency
Bisphosphonate	Relative potency
Etidronate	1
Tiludronate	10
Pamidronate	100
Alendronate	100-500
Ibandronate	500-1000
Risedronate	1000
Zoledronate	5000

=== Absorption ===
Ibandronate has good oral absorption, for it only takes less than an hour for the drug to reach its peak concentration within the bloodstream. The absorption of the oral tablet can be evaluated by analyzing the following factors of the chemical structure of the active drug Ibandronate: its molecular weight, hydrogen bond acceptors, hydrogen bond donors, and its clogP value. Generally, a medication is predicted to have good oral absorption if the chemical structure of the active ingredient has a molecular weight less than 500g/mol, has less than or equal to ten hydrogen bond acceptors, has less than or equal to five hydrogen bond donors, and its clogP value is less than or equal to five. Ibandronate meets these criteria – its molecular weight is 319.23 g/mol, it has eight hydrogen bond acceptors, five hydrogen bond donors, and its clogP value is in the negative range. It is important, however, to not confuse good oral absorption with bioavailability. Despite the drug’s rapid absorption, Ibandronate has a low bioavailability of 0.63%.

== Society and culture ==
=== Brand names ===
Ibandronic acid is sold under the brand names Boncare, Boniva, Bondronat, Bonviva, Bandrone, Ibandrix, Adronil, Bondrova, Bonprove, and Fosfonat.
