= Salmon calcitonin =

Salmon calcitonin (sCT) is the type of calcitonin hormone found in salmon.

Similar to humans, salmon calcitonin is a peptide hormone produced in the ultimobranchial region by parafollicular cells in response to hypercalcemia and lowers blood calcium and phosphate by promoting renal excretion.

== Composition ==
Salcatonin is composed of 32 amino acids, of which 13 differ from human calcitonin. The structure of human calcitonin and salcatonin is as follows:

Human calcitonin:

H-Cys^{1}-Gly-Asn-Leu-Ser-Thr-Cys^{7}-Met-Leu-Gly-Thr-Tyr-Thr-Gln-Asp-Phe-Asn-Lys-Phe-His-Thr-Phe-Pro-Gln-Thr-Ala-lle-Gly-Val-Gly-Ala-Pro-NH_{2}

Salcatonin:

H-Cys^{1}-Ser-Asn-Leu-Ser-Thr-Cys^{7}-Val-Leu-Gly-Lys-Leu-Ser-Gln-Glu-Leu-His-Lys-Leu-Gln-Thr-Tyr-Pro-Arg-Thr-Asn-Thr-Gly-Ser-Gly-Thr-Pro-NH_{2}

The cysteine in the first and seventh positions form a disulfide bond.

== Therapeutic usage ==
Synthetic salmon calcitonin may be used therapeutically in humans, as it is twenty times more active than human calcitonin and has a longer half-life. It is used as therapy for Paget's disease, severe hypercalcemia, and in some cases, gynecomastia. It is also used as a therapy against osteoporosis working as an inhibitor of osteoclastic resorption and production of osteoclast precursors), having an effectiveness of 40-50 times that of the human analogue. Studies have shown that treatment of with salcatonin can reduce the rate of new fractures in the lumbar spine and the forearm in postmenopausal women. They may also have analgesic effects, relieving bone pain.

== Pharmaceutical salmon calcitonin formulations ==
Calcitonin, as salmon calcitonin (sCT), is available in the pharmaceutical market as an injectable preparation for intravenous, intramuscular or subcutaneous application. Noninvasive sCT preparation as a nasal spray is commercially produced and received US FDA approval under the proprietary name Miacalcin® in 1975 for the treatment of postmenopausal osteoporosis. The bioavailability of Miacalcin® nasal spray relative to the injectable form is between 3% and 5%. Currently, a number of sCT oral preparations are under clinical trials and at least one of them has reached Phase III of clinical approval.
