= HEDP =

HEDP is an abbreviation for:

- High Explosive Dual Purpose anti-tank / fragmenting warhead
- Etidronic acid or etidronate
- High energy density physics
- the Higher Education Development Program of the Commission on Higher Education (Philippines)
