= ATC code M05 =

ATC code M05 Drugs for treatment of bone diseases is a therapeutic subgroup of the Anatomical Therapeutic Chemical Classification System, a system of alphanumeric codes developed by the World Health Organization (WHO) for the classification of drugs and other medical products. Subgroup M05 is part of the anatomical group M Musculo-skeletal system.

Codes for veterinary use (ATCvet codes) can be created by placing the letter Q in front of the human ATC code: for example, QM05.
National versions of the ATC classification may include additional codes not present in this list, which follows the WHO version.

== M05B Drugs affecting bone structure and mineralization ==
=== M05BA Bisphosphonates ===
M05BA01 Etidronic acid
M05BA02 Clodronic acid
M05BA03 Pamidronic acid
M05BA04 Alendronic acid
M05BA05 Tiludronic acid
M05BA06 Ibandronic acid
M05BA07 Risedronic acid
M05BA08 Zoledronic acid

=== M05BB Bisphosphonates, combinations ===
M05BB01 Etidronic acid and calcium, sequential
M05BB02 Risedronic acid and calcium, sequential
M05BB03 Alendronic acid and colecalciferol
M05BB04 Risedronic acid, calcium and colecalciferol, sequential
M05BB05 Alendronic acid, calcium and colecalciferol, sequential
M05BB06 Alendronic acid and alfacalcidol, sequential
M05BB07 Risedronic acid and colecalciferol
M05BB08 Zoledronic acid, calcium and colecalciferol, sequential
M05BB09 Ibandronic acid and colecalciferol

=== M05BC Bone morphogenetic proteins ===
M05BC01 Dibotermin alfa
M05BC02 Eptotermin alfa

=== M05BX Other drugs affecting bone structure and mineralization ===
M05BX01 Ipriflavone
M05BX02 Aluminium chlorohydrate
M05BX03 Strontium ranelate
M05BX04 Denosumab
M05BX05 Burosumab
M05BX06 Romosozumab
M05BX07 Vosoritide
M05BX08 Menatetrenone
M05BX53 Strontium ranelate and colecalciferol
