= Hypercalemia =

Hypercalemia may refer to, or be a mistype of:

- Hypercalcemia, or deficient levels of calcium in blood serum
- Hyperkalemia, or deficient levels of potassium (kalium) in blood serum
