= Limb perfusion =

Limb perfusion is a medical technique that is used to deliver drugs locally directly to a site of interest. It is commonly used in human medicine for administration of anticancer drugs directly to an arm or leg. It is also used in veterinary medicine to deliver drugs to a site of infection or injury, as well as for the treatment of cancer in dogs. In both cases, a tourniquet is used to reduce blood flow out of the area that is being treated.

== Use in human medicine ==
Isolated limb perfusion was first introduced into the clinic by American surgeons from New Orleans in the mid-1950s. The main purpose of the isolated limb perfusion technique is to deliver a very high dose of chemotherapy, at elevated temperature, to tumour sites without causing overwhelming systemic damage. (Unfortunately, while these approaches can be useful against solitary or limited metastases, they are - by definition - not systemic and therefore do not treat distributed metastases or micrometastases). The flow of blood to and from the limb is temporarily stopped with a tourniquet, and anticancer drugs are put directly into the blood of the limb. This allows the person to receive a high dose of drugs in the area where the cancer occurred. The temperature is also increased to 42C causing an increased uptake of the drug by the tumor. The combination of high drug dose and high temperature is toxic systemically, thus the isolation of the limb. Blood flow through the limb is typically achieved using an extracorporeal circuit consisting of cannulae, tubing, peristaltic roller pump, heat exchanger, and pressure monitoring/safety devices. Care must be used in handling the drugs and waste material as they are extremely toxic. Among other types of cancer, isolated limb perfusion has been used to treat in transit metastatic melanoma.

In the early 1990s an alternative technique was developed at the Royal Prince Alfred Hospital in Sydney, Australia: isolated limb infusion. This technique is less complex and uses a minimal invasive percutaneous approach to circulatorily isolate a limb.

== Use in veterinary medicine ==
Limb perfusion is also used in veterinary medicine, where is it usually referred to as regional limb perfusion (RLP). It is most commonly used in large animals, such as horses, cows, small ruminants, and camelids. These species often require large, cost-prohibitive doses of medications to treat systemically. Regional limb perfusion allows drug dose to be reduced while maintaining therapeutic concentrations at the site of interest, thereby reducing the cost of treatment, localizing application, decreasing systemic side effects, and improving efficacy.

=== Method ===
Horses are sedated and the procedure is performed standing. Horses must be sedated, because movement can force blood past the tourniquet and reduce the concentration of drug below the site of the tourniquet. The area of needle insertion is clipped and scrubbed. A wide tourniquet is placed above the site of interest, and a needle inserted into a superficial vein of the limb below the tourniquet. The medication is delivered and the tourniquet is removed after 20–30 minutes. Because of the size of the limbs, RLP is not possible above the elbow or stifle of a horse because of inadequate compression of the underlying blood vessels.

=== Medications used ===
Limb perfusion is commonly used for antibiotic administration in cases of localized infection, such as lacerations, cellulitis, infection of a synovial structure (joint, tendon sheath, bursa), or osteomyelitis. RLP has been shown to produce antibiotic concentrations 25-50 times the minimum inhibitory concentration in septic joints. Antibiotic selection is important. Antibiotics must be approved for intravenous use, and are ideally chosen based on culture and susceptibility results. Concentration-dependent antibiotics, such as gentamicin and amikacin, are best suited for RLP because they have higher efficacy at higher concentrations, while time-dependent antibiotics such as penicillin and ceftiofur may be used, but have a shorter duration. However, expense is usually less of a limiting factor because a smaller amount may be used relative to systemic administration.

Limb perfusion of carbapenem antibiotics such as imipenem and meropenem have been studied in horses. However, a retrospective study comparing horses that received meropenem via RLP for orthopedics sepsis to a group of horses that received gentamicin via RLP for the same condition had no differences in outcome. This suggests that initial RLP treatments should utilize less critically important antimicrobials for initial RLP treatment such a gentamicin, instead of critically important antimicrobials, such as meropenem.

In the case of lameness in horses, local use of regenerative therapies, such as stem cells, or bisphosphonates such as tiludronic acid are also given by RLP.

In dogs, RLP is also used to deliver chemotherapeutic agents.

=== Adverse effects ===
Side effects of RLP are relatively rare when performed correctly. Partial thrombosis of a vein can occur, especially with repeated use of a vein, but complete thrombosis is rare. There may also be localized tissue irritation. Topical application of an anti-inflammatory, such as DMSO or Diclofenac sodium may be used.
