= Minodronic acid =

Names
- Preferred IUPAC name [1-Hydroxy-2-(imidazo[1,2-a]pyridin-3-yl)ethane-1,1-diyl]bis(phosphonic acid)
- Other names Minodronate; YM 529

Identifiers
CAS Number	180064-38-4; 155648-60-5 (monohydrate)
3D model (JSmol)	Interactive image
ChEMBL	ChEMBL319144
ChemSpider	115805
IUPHAR/BPS	3164
PubChem CID	130956
UNII	40SGR63TGL; 457X74V7ND (monohydrate)
CompTox Dashboard (EPA)	DTXSID4048779
- InChI: InChI=1S/C9H12N2O7P2/c12-9(19(13,14)15,20(16,17)18)5-7-6-10-8-3-1-2-4-11(7)8/h1-4,6,12H,5H2,(H2,13,14,15)(H2,16,17,18) Key: VMMKGHQPQIEGSQ-UHFFFAOYSA-N
- SMILES: O=P(O)(O)C(O)(P(=O)(O)O)Cc1cnc2ccccn12

Properties
Chemical formula	C_{9}H_{12}N_{2}O_{7}P_{2}
Molar mass	322.150 g·mol^{−1}
- Except where otherwise noted, data are given for materials in their standard state (at 25 °C [77 °F], 100 kPa). verify (what is ?) Infobox references

Minodronic acid is a third-generation bisphosphonate drug. It is approved for use in Japan for the treatment of osteoporosis. Its mechanism of action involves inhibition of farnesyl pyrophosphate synthase activity.
