= Neridronic acid =

Chemical compound

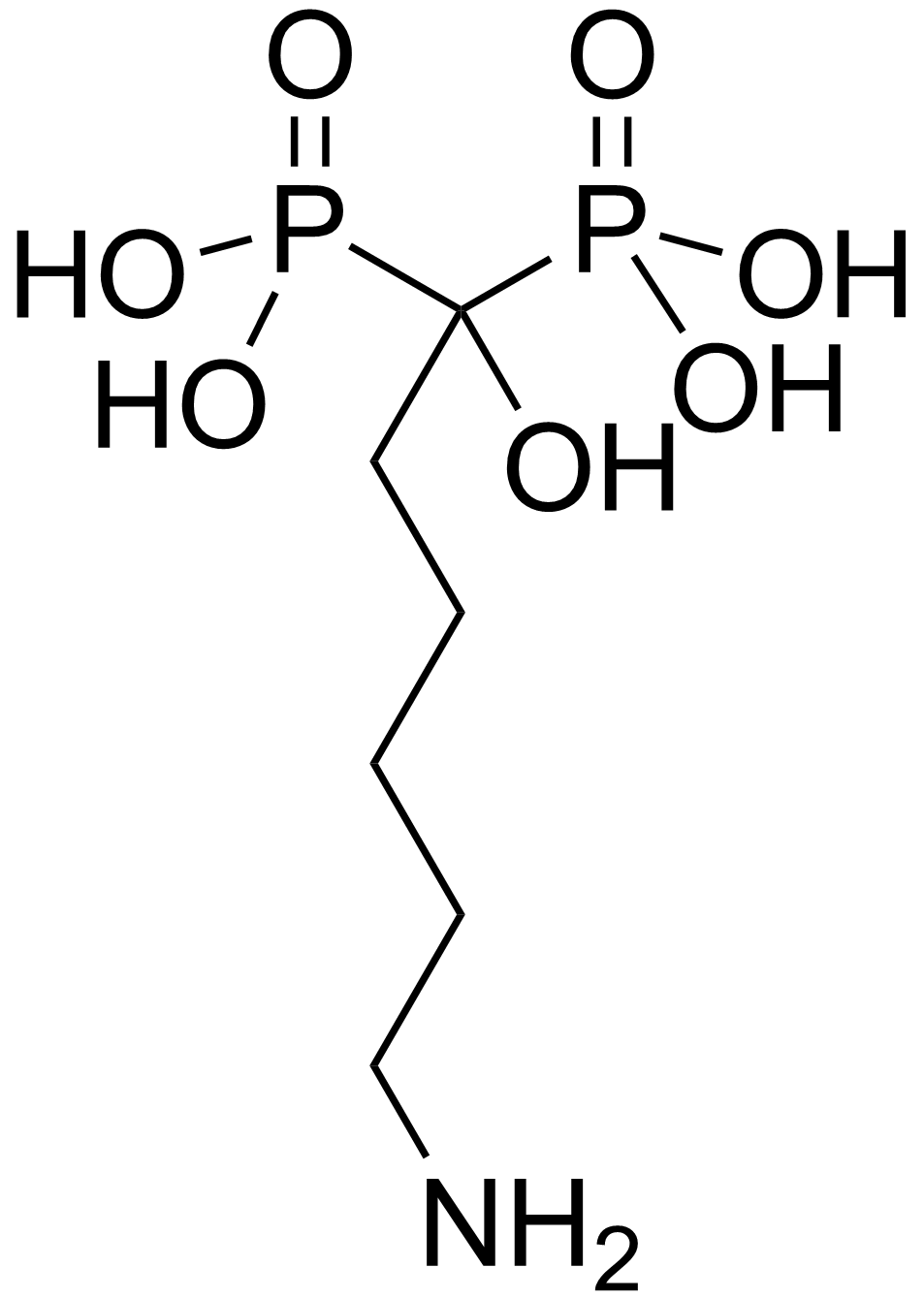

Clinical data
- ATC code: none

Identifiers
- IUPAC name: (6-Amino-1-hydroxyhexane-1,1-diyl)bis(phosphonic acid)
- CAS Number: 79778-41-9
- PubChem CID: 71237
- ChemSpider: 64372
- UNII: 8U27U3RIN4
- CompTox Dashboard (EPA): DTXSID40868545
- ECHA InfoCard: 100.163.818

Chemical and physical data
- Formula: C_{6}H_{17}NO_{7}P_{2}
- Molar mass: 277.150 g·mol^{−1}
- 3D model (JSmol): Interactive image
- SMILES: C(CCC(O)(P(=O)(O)O)P(=O)(O)O)CCN
- InChI: InChI=1S/C6H17NO7P2/c7-5-3-1-2-4-6(8,15(9,10)11)16(12,13)14/h8H,1-5,7H2,(H2,9,10,11)(H2,12,13,14); Key:PUUSSSIBPPTKTP-UHFFFAOYSA-N

Neridronic acid (INN; the anion is called neridronate) is a bisphosphonate. In Italy it is used to treat osteogenesis imperfecta and Paget's disease of bone.

A 2013 clinical trial suggests complex regional pain syndrome type 1 (CRPS) responds to treatment with intravenous neridronate.
