= GGPS1 =

Protein-coding gene in humans

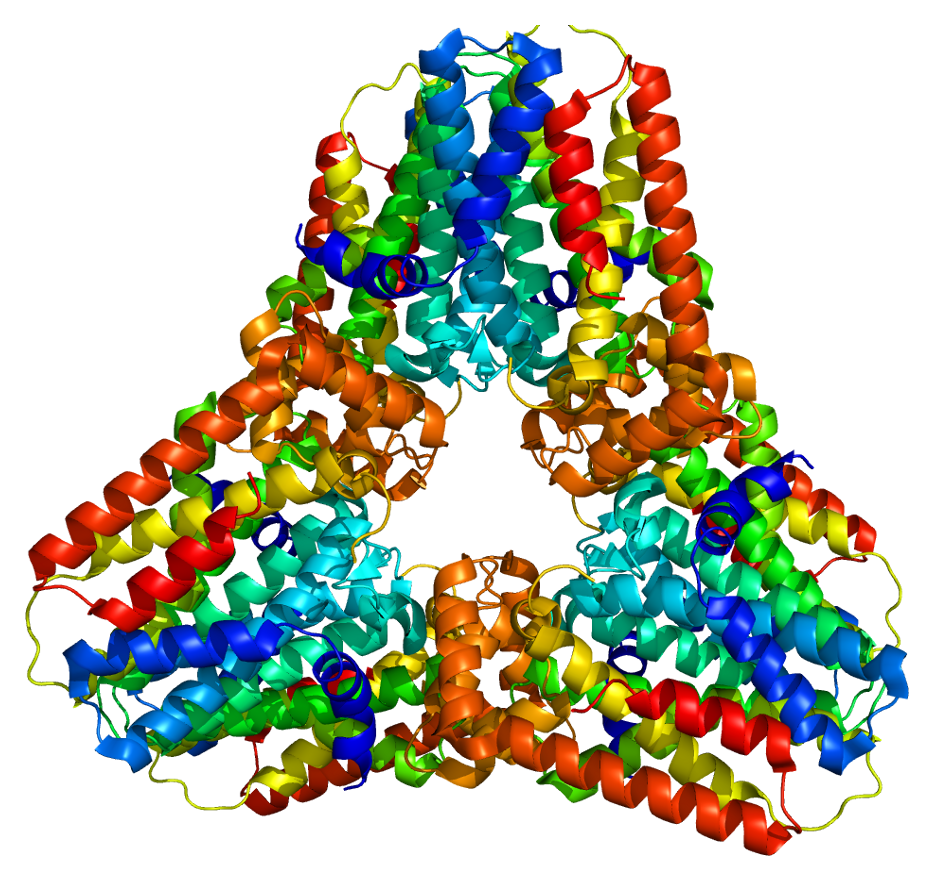

Identifiers
- Aliases: GGPS1, GGPPS, GGPPS1, geranylgeranyl diphosphate synthase 1, MDHLO, MUDHLOV
- External IDs: OMIM: 606982; MGI: 1341724; GeneCards: GGPS1
Available structures
PDB	Ortholog search: PDBe RCSB
PDB	List of PDB id codes 2Q80
Enzyme activity
EC #	BRENDA	ExPASy	KEGG	MetaCyc
2.5.1.1	↗	↗	↗	↗
2.5.1.10	↗	↗	↗	↗
2.5.1.29	↗	↗	↗	↗

Gene location (Human)
Chr.	Chromosome 1 (human)
Band	1q42.3	Start	235,327,350 bp
Band	1q42.3	End	235,344,532 bp

Gene location (Mouse)
Chr.	Chromosome 13 (mouse)
Band	13 A1|13 5.29 cM	Start	14,225,244 bp
Band	13 A1|13 5.29 cM	End	14,238,073 bp
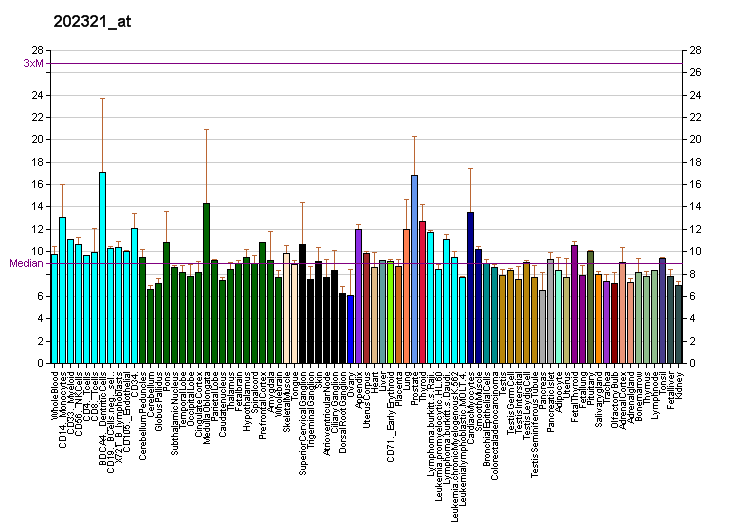

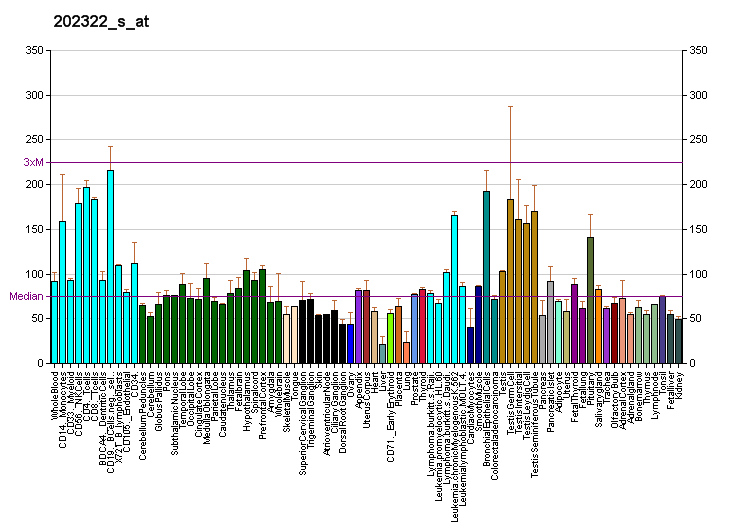
RNA expression pattern
Bgee	Human / Mouse (ortholog); Top expressed in: sperm; ganglionic eminence; islet of Langerhans; skin of thigh; glutes; optic nerve; epithelium of colon; gingival epithelium; left testis; right testis / Top expressed in: Rostral migratory stream; pineal gland; genital tubercle; tail of embryo; medial ganglionic eminence; ventricular zone; lateral geniculate nucleus; dentate gyrus of hippocampal formation granule cell; epithelium of lens; seminal vesicula; More reference expression data
BioGPS	More reference expression data
Gene ontology
Molecular function	transferase activity; farnesyltranstransferase activity; protein binding; metal ion binding; dimethylallyltranstransferase activity; geranyltranstransferase activity; identical protein binding
Cellular component	cytoplasm; cytosol
Biological process	cholesterol biosynthetic process; farnesyl diphosphate biosynthetic process; geranyl diphosphate biosynthetic process; geranylgeranyl diphosphate biosynthetic process; isoprenoid biosynthetic process; isoprenoid metabolic process; regulation of cholesterol biosynthetic process
Sources:Amigo / QuickGO
Orthologs
Databases	NCBI: entry; OMA: entry
Species	Human	Mouse
Entrez	9453	14593
Ensembl	ENSG00000152904	ENSMUSG00000021302
UniProt	O95749	Q9WTN0
RefSeq (mRNA)	NM_001037277; NM_001037278; NM_004837; NM_001371477; NM_001371478	NM_010282; NM_001331119; NM_001331176; NM_001331177; NM_001331178 NM_001331180
RefSeq (protein)	NP_001032354; NP_001032355; NP_001358406; NP_001358407; NP_004828 NP_001032354.1	NP_001318048; NP_001318105; NP_001318106; NP_001318107; NP_001318109 NP_034412
Location (UCSC)	Chr 1: 235.33 – 235.34 Mb	Chr 13: 14.23 – 14.24 Mb
PubMed search
- Wikidata
View/Edit Human	View/Edit Mouse

Geranylgeranyl pyrophosphate synthase is an enzyme that in humans is encoded by the GGPS1 gene.

== Function ==
This gene is a member of the prenyltransferase family and encodes a protein with geranylgeranyl diphosphate (GGPP) synthase activity. The enzyme catalyzes the synthesis of GGPP from farnesyl diphosphate and isopentenyl diphosphate. GGPP is an important molecule responsible for the C20-prenylation of proteins and for the regulation of a nuclear hormone receptor. Alternate transcriptional splice variants, encoding different isoforms, have been characterized.

Much like its homolog farnesyl diphosphate synthase, GGPS1 is inhibited by bisphosphonate compounds.

== Clinical ==
Mutations in both copies of this gene have been associated with a syndrome of muscular dystrophy, hearing loss and ovarian insufficiency.
