= Olpadronic acid =

Chemical compound

Clinical data
- ATC code: none

Identifiers
- IUPAC name: [3-(Dimethylamino)-1-hydroxypropane-1,1-diyl]bis(phosphonic acid)
- CAS Number: 63132-39-8
- PubChem CID: 198716
- ChemSpider: 171999
- UNII: 874HHB2V3S
- CompTox Dashboard (EPA): DTXSID50212479

Chemical and physical data
- Formula: C_{5}H_{15}NO_{7}P_{2}
- Molar mass: 263.123 g·mol^{−1}
- 3D model (JSmol): Interactive image
- SMILES: CN(C)CCC(O)(P(=O)(O)O)P(=O)(O)O
- InChI: InChI=1S/C5H15NO7P2/c1-6(2)4-3-5(7,14(8,9)10)15(11,12)13/h7H,3-4H2,1-2H3,(H2,8,9,10)(H2,11,12,13); Key:UGEPSJNLORCRBO-UHFFFAOYSA-N

Olpadronic acid (INN; salt form olpadronate) is a bisphosphonate. It is used as part of a cancer symptom treatment support in cases of high blood calcium levels (hypercalcemia) and the reduction of fractures/pain that are the result of when cancer spreads to the bone (metastasis).
