= Clodronic acid =

Chemical compound

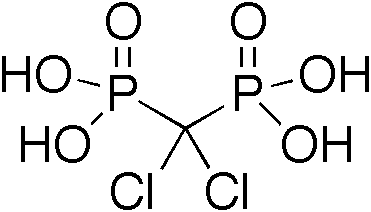

Clinical data
- AHFS/Drugs.com: International Drug Names
- ATC code: M05BA02 (WHO)

Legal status
- Legal status: CA: ℞-only

Identifiers
- IUPAC name: (Dichloro-phosphono-methyl)phosphonic acid
- CAS Number: 10596-23-3
- PubChem CID: 25419
- DrugBank: DB00720
- ChemSpider: 23731
- UNII: 0813BZ6866
- KEGG: D03545
- ChEBI: CHEBI:110423
- ChEMBL: ChEMBL12318
- CompTox Dashboard (EPA): DTXSID8046959
- ECHA InfoCard: 100.031.090

Chemical and physical data
- Formula: CH_{4}Cl_{2}O_{6}P_{2}
- Molar mass: 244.88 g·mol^{−1}
- 3D model (JSmol): Interactive image
- SMILES: ClC(Cl)(P(=O)(O)O)P(=O)(O)O
- InChI: InChI=1S/CH4Cl2O6P2/c2-1(3,10(4,5)6)11(7,8)9/h(H2,4,5,6)(H2,7,8,9); Key:ACSIXWWBWUQEHA-UHFFFAOYSA-N

Clodronic acid (INN) or clodronate disodium (Na_{2}CH_{2}Cl_{2}O_{6}P_{2}) (USAN) is a first generation (non-nitrogenous) bisphosphonate. It is an anti-osteoporotic drug approved for the prevention and treatment of osteoporosis in post-menopausal women and men to reduce vertebral fractures, hyperparathyroidism, hypercalcemia in malignancy, multiple myeloma and fracture related pain because of its anti-inflammatory effects shown as a reduction in inflammatory markers like IL-1β, IL-6, and TNF-α.

== Medical uses ==
A study comparing the analgesic effect of clodronic acid versus acetaminophen in osteoporotic vertebral fractures showed that clodronic acid provided more analgesia than 3 grams/day of acetaminophen.

Clodronic acid is also used in experimental medicine to selectively deplete macrophages.

Clodronic acid is approved for human use in Canada and Australia, the United Kingdom, where it is marketed as Bonefos, Loron, Clodron and in Italy as Clasteon, Difosfonal, Osteostab and several generics. In other countries is prescribed as a bone resorption inhibitor and antihypercalcemic agent. It is not approved for use in the United States, because it has too many adverse effects.

== Veterinary uses ==
Clodronic acid is approved for use in horses under the trade name Osphos, for treatment of bone resorptive processes of navicular syndrome. It is given by intramuscular injection at one point in time, with the total dose divided into 2-3 sites on the horse. Clinical effects (e.g. improvement of lameness) after a single treatment can be seen up to 6 months post-treatment.

=== Adverse effects ===
Clodronic acid has been shown to have several adverse effects. These include:

- Signs of discomfort, agitation, or colic, usually within 2 hours of treatment.
- Head shaking
- Lip licking
- Renal failure
