= Pamidronic acid =

Chemical compound

Clinical data
- Trade names: Aredia, Pamimed, among others
- Other names: Pamidronate disodium pentahydrate, pamidronate disodium
- AHFS/Drugs.com: International Drug Names
- MedlinePlus: a601163
- Pregnancy category: AU: B3
- Routes of administration: Intravenous
- ATC code: M05BA03 (WHO)

Legal status
- Legal status: UK: POM (Prescription only); US: ℞-only

Pharmacokinetic data
- Bioavailability: n/a
- Protein binding: 54%
- Metabolism: Nil
- Elimination half-life: 28 ± 7 hours
- Excretion: Renal

Identifiers
- IUPAC name: (3-amino-1-hydroxypropane-1,1-diyl)bis(phosphonic acid)
- CAS Number: 40391-99-9
- PubChem CID: 4674
- IUPHAR/BPS: 7259
- DrugBank: DB00282
- ChemSpider: 4512
- UNII: OYY3447OMC
- KEGG: D07281
- ChEMBL: ChEMBL834
- CompTox Dashboard (EPA): DTXSID4023414
- ECHA InfoCard: 100.049.897

Chemical and physical data
- Formula: C_{3}H_{11}NO_{7}P_{2}
- Molar mass: 235.069 g·mol^{−1}
- 3D model (JSmol): Interactive image
- SMILES: O=P(O)(O)C(O)(CCN)P(=O)(O)O
- InChI: InChI=1S/C3H11NO7P2/c4-2-1-3(5,12(6,7)8)13(9,10)11/h5H,1-2,4H2,(H2,6,7,8)(H2,9,10,11); Key:WRUUGTRCQOWXEG-UHFFFAOYSA-N

Pamidronic acid or pamidronate disodium or APD (marketed as Aredia among others), is a nitrogen-containing bisphosphonate used to prevent osteoporosis.

It was patented in 1971 and approved for medical use in 1987.

== Medical uses ==
It is used to prevent bone loss, and treat osteoporosis. It is also used to strengthen bone in Paget's disease, to prevent bone loss due to steroid use, and in certain cancers with high propensity to bone, such as multiple myeloma. Due to its ability to sequester calcium in bone, it is also used to treat high calcium levels. It is also used as an experimental treatment of the bone disorder osteogenesis imperfecta. It has been studied in the treatment of complex regional pain syndrome.

=== Administration ===
Intravenous, usually 90 mg monthly. 30 mg, 60 mg, 90 mg and for hospitals, 120 mg vials are available, mixed with mannitol.

== Side effects ==
Common side effects include bone pain, low calcium levels, nausea, and dizziness. Osteonecrosis of the jaw is a rare complication which has been associated with the use of bisphosphonates, including pamidronate.

Pamidronate activates human γδ T cells in vitro and in vivo, which may lead to flu-like symptoms upon administration.

== Pharmacology ==
Relative potency
Bisphosphonate	Relative potency
Etidronate	1
Tiludronate	10
Pamidronate	100
Alendronate	100-500
Ibandronate	500-1000
Risedronate	1000
Zoledronate	5000
