= Tiludronic acid =

Chemical compound

Clinical data
- Trade names: Skelid
- AHFS/Drugs.com: International Drug Names
- ATC code: M05BA05 (WHO)

Legal status
- Legal status: CA: ℞-only

Identifiers
- IUPAC name: {[(4-Chlorophenyl)thio]methylene}bis(phosphonic acid)
- CAS Number: 89987-06-4
- PubChem CID: 60937
- IUPHAR/BPS: 7604
- DrugBank: DB01133
- ChemSpider: 54905
- UNII: 6PNS59HP4Y
- KEGG: D08599
- ChEMBL: ChEMBL1350
- CompTox Dashboard (EPA): DTXSID10237966
- ECHA InfoCard: 100.121.105

Chemical and physical data
- Formula: C_{7}H_{9}ClO_{6}P_{2}S
- Molar mass: 318.60 g·mol^{−1}
- 3D model (JSmol): Interactive image
- SMILES: c1cc(ccc1SC(P(=O)(O)O)P(=O)(O)O)Cl
- InChI: InChI=1S/C7H9ClO6P2S/c8-5-1-3-6(4-2-5)17-7(15(9,10)11)16(12,13)14/h1-4,7H,(H2,9,10,11)(H2,12,13,14); Key:DKJJVAGXPKPDRL-UHFFFAOYSA-N

Tiludronic acid (INN; also known as tiludronate) is a bisphosphonate used for treatment of Paget's disease of bone (osteitis deformans) in human being medicine. It has the tradename Skelid. In veterinary medicine, tiludronic acid is used to treat navicular disease and bone spavin in horses. Its tradenames are Tildren and Equidronate. It is approved for treatment of navicular disease and distal, tarsal osteoarthritis in Europe, and was approved for treatment of navicular disease in the United States in 2014.

== Mechanism of action ==
Tiludronate is a non-nitrogenous bisphosphonate that inhibits osteoclasts, the primary cell responsible for the breakdown of bone required for bone remodeling. Non-nitrogenous bisphosphonates are metabolized by osteoclasts to compounds that then replace a portion of the adenosine triphosphate (ATP) molecule, making it non-functional. These non-functional molecules then competitively inhibit ATP in the cell, reducing cell energy and leading to apoptosis. Decreased levels of osteoclasts subsequently reduce the degree of breakdown of bone and bone turnover. Non-nitrogenous bisphosphonates are less potent than nitrogenous bisphosphonates.

Relative potency
| Bisphosphonate | Relative potency |
|---|---|
| Etidronate | 1 |
| Tiludronate | 10 |
| Pamidronate | 100 |
| Aledronate | 100-500 |
| Ibandronate | 500-1000 |
| Risedronate | 1000 |
| Zoledronate | 5000 |

== Use in equine medicine ==
Tiludronate has been used primarily for the treatment of diseases in horses that are associated with inappropriate osteolysis, such as navicular disease and osteoarthritis. It has specifically been shown to improve lameness in horses with osteoarthritis of the distal hock joints (bone spavin) and vertebral column.

=== Method of administration ===
Tildren is administered intravenously. It is labeled for 0.1 mg/kg dosing, once daily for 10 days by slow intravenous injection, which for a 500 kg horse works out to be 1 vial per day. However, one study giving all 10 doses at once (1 mg/kg IV as a single CRI) was found to have the same pharmacological effects, and is used clinically. It may be given systemically or locally, by regional limb perfusion. Although RLP is thought to have certain benefits, including decreased cost and reduced risk of adverse effects, some diseases must be treated systemically, such as osteoarthritis of the vertebral column. Systemic administration is often given by adding a 1 mg/kg dose into a 1-liter fluid bag, which is slowly given over 60–90 minutes. Its effects are reported to last 4 months or longer, with a peak effect 6–8 weeks post treatment. The effects of regional limb perfusion has come into question due to in vitro studies showing that high doses given by RLP or intraarticular injection may damage articular cartilage by chondrocyte apoptosis. Further studies are needed to evaluate the safety of Tildren administration via RLP.

=== Adverse reactions and contraindications ===
Tildren has been shown to have several adverse effects.

- Signs of colic, which is usually self-limiting, occurs in 30-45% of horses.
- Tachycardia
- Electrolyte disturbances: primarily calcium, magnesium, and potassium, which can last for several hours. Caution should be used in horses with disease processes that could be affected by electrolyte disturbances, such as hyperkalemic periodic paralysis or cardiac disease.
- Kidney damage: it is eliminated by the kidney and is not recommended for use in animals with impaired renal function.
- Less serious reactions include stiffness of the neck, decreased appetite, fever, and increased urination.

It is not recommended for animals under four years of age, due to lack of studies evaluating its safety in growing animals, nor for pregnant or lactating animals, since its effect on the fetus has not been studied.
