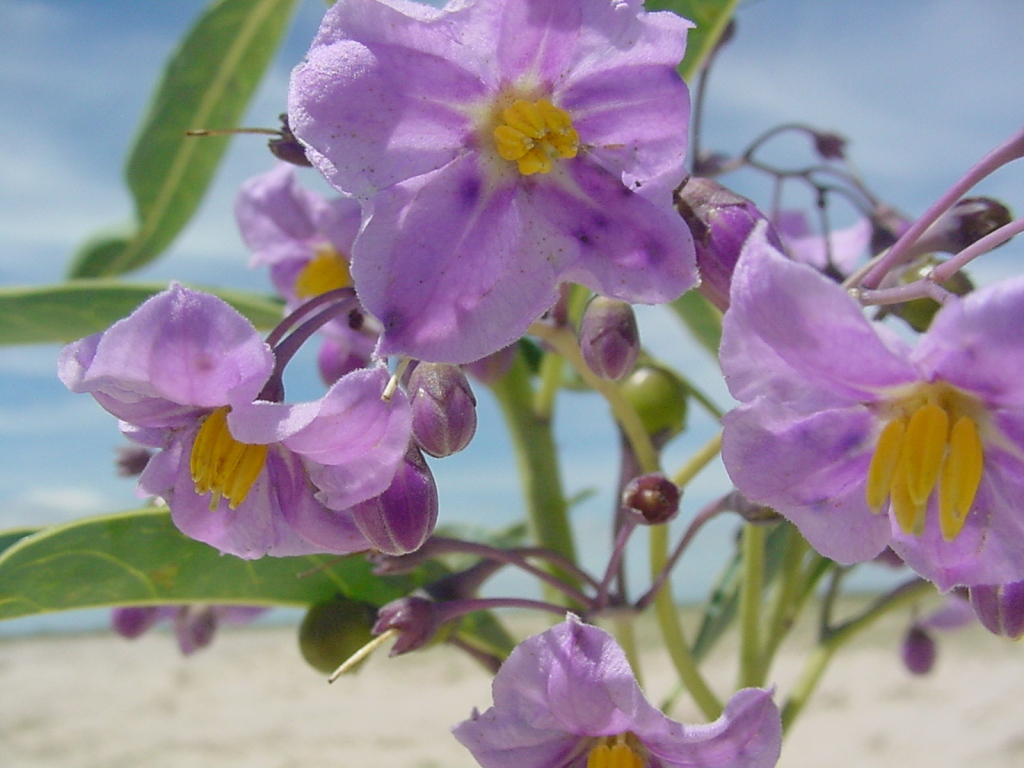

Scientific classification
- Kingdom: Plantae
- Clade: Embryophytes
- Clade: Tracheophytes
- Clade: Spermatophytes
- Clade: Angiosperms
- Clade: Eudicots
- Clade: Asterids
- Order: Solanales
- Family: Solanaceae
- Genus: Solanum
- Species: S. glaucophyllum

Binomial name
- Solanum glaucophyllum Desf.

Synonyms
- List: Solanum glaucescens Bacle ex Dunal; Solanum glaucum Bertol.; Solanum glaucum Dunal; Solanum glaucum Rojas; Solanum glaucum-fruticosum Larrañaga; Solanum malacoxylon Sendtn.; Solanum malacoxylon f. albomarginatum (Chodat) Hassl.; Solanum malacoxylon var. albomarginatum Chodat; Solanum malacoxylon var. angustissimum (Kuntze) Hassl.; Solanum malacoxylon var. angustissimum Kuntze; Solanum malacoxylon var. genuinum Hassl.; Solanum malacoxylon var. latifolium Kuntze; Solanum malacoxylon var. subvirescens Hassl.; Solanum malacoxylon f. vulgare Hassl.

= Solanum glaucophyllum =

Species of flowering plant

Solanum glaucophyllum is a species of plant in the family Solanaceae. It is known as waxyleaf nightshade. It is native to Brazil, Bolivia, Argentina, Paraguay and Uruguay.

It is usually classified under the section Cyphomandropsis, within the subgenus Bassovia.

It is a rhizomatous plant with a simple stem and shortly branched, growing to 1–2 m (3.3–6.6 ft) tall or more. The leaves are simple, ovate, lanceolate, greenish-gray, and the plant produces 1–2 cm (0.4–0.8 in) long, bluish purple flowers. The fruit is a globose berry 1–2 cm in diameter, blue-black, and contains several seeds. The plant propagates vegetatively by gemmiferous roots of high regeneration capacity in water-saturated soils like edges of lakes.

It is poisonous to ruminants. It is one of the few plants that creates vitamin D.
