= Risedronic acid =

Chemical compound

Clinical data
- Trade names: Actonel, Atelvia, Benet, others
- AHFS/Drugs.com: Monograph
- License data: US DailyMed: Risedronic
- Pregnancy category: AU: B3
- Routes of administration: By mouth
- ATC code: M05BA07 (WHO)

Legal status
- Legal status: AU: S4 (Prescription only); UK: POM (Prescription only); US: ℞-only; In general: ℞ (Prescription only)

Pharmacokinetic data
- Bioavailability: 0.63%
- Protein binding: ~24%
- Metabolism: None
- Elimination half-life: 1.5 h
- Excretion: Kidney and fecal

Identifiers
- IUPAC name: (1-hydroxy-1-phosphono-2-pyridin-3-yl-ethyl)phosphonic acid
- CAS Number: 105462-24-6
- PubChem CID: 5245
- IUPHAR/BPS: 3176
- DrugBank: DB00884
- ChemSpider: 5055
- UNII: KM2Z91756Z
- KEGG: D00942; D03234
- ChEMBL: ChEMBL923
- PDB ligand: RIS (PDBe, RCSB PDB)
- CompTox Dashboard (EPA): DTXSID2023563
- ECHA InfoCard: 100.116.436

Chemical and physical data
- Formula: C_{7}H_{11}NO_{7}P_{2}
- Molar mass: 283.113 g·mol^{−1}
- 3D model (JSmol): Interactive image
- SMILES: OC(Cc1cccnc1)(P(=O)(O)O)P(=O)(O)O
- InChI: InChI=1S/C7H11NO7P2/c9-7(16(10,11)12,17(13,14)15)4-6-2-1-3-8-5-6/h1-3,5,9H,4H2,(H2,10,11,12)(H2,13,14,15); Key:IIDJRNMFWXDHID-UHFFFAOYSA-N

Risedronic acid, often used as its sodium salt risedronate sodium, is a bisphosphonate. It slows down the cells which break down bone. It's used to treat or prevent osteoporosis, and treat Paget's disease of bone. It is taken by mouth.

It was patented in 1984 and approved for medical use in 1998.

== Pharmacology ==
Relative potency
Bisphosphonate	Relative potency
Etidronate	1
Tiludronate	10
Pamidronate	100
Alendronate	100-500
Ibandronate	500-1000
Risedronate	1000
Zoledronate	5000

== History ==
Risedronate, known as NE-58095 while under development, was discovered by scientists at the Cincinnati Miami Valley Laboratories and the Norwich Eaton Laboratories of Procter and Gamble.

== Society and culture ==
=== Brand names ===
It is produced and marketed by Warner Chilcott, Sanofi-Aventis, and in Japan by Takeda under the trade names Actonel, Atelvia, and Benet. It is also available in a preparation that includes a calcium carbonate supplement, as Actonel with Calcium.

=== Controversies ===
In January 2006 P&G and its marketing partner Sanofi-Aventis filed a Lanham Act false claims lawsuit against rival drugmakers Roche and GlaxoSmithKline claiming false advertising about Boniva. The manufacturers of Boniva, a rival bisphosphonate, were accused in the suit of causing a "serious public health risk" through misrepresentation of scientific findings. In a ruling on September 7, 2006, U.S. District Judge Paul A. Crotty rejected P&G's attempted injunction. P&G was criticized for attempting to "preserve its market share by denigrating Boniva". Judge Crotty wrote that "Roche was clearly entitled to respond with its own data, provided that the data was truthfully and accurately presented".

In 2006, P&G faced controversy over its handling of clinical research involving risedronate (News Reports and discussion).

In common with other bisphosphonate drugs, risedronate appears to be associated with the rare side effect osteonecrosis of the jaw, often preceded by dental procedures inducing trauma to the bone.
