= Etidronic acid =

Chemical compound

Clinical data
- Trade names: Didronel, others
- Other names: 1-Hydroxyethylidene-1,1-diphosphonic acid; HEDP
- AHFS/Drugs.com: International Drug Names
- License data: US FDA: Etidronate+disodium
- Routes of administration: Oral, intravenous
- ATC code: M05BA01 (WHO) M05BB01 (WHO)

Legal status
- Legal status: In general: ℞ (Prescription only)

Pharmacokinetic data
- Bioavailability: 3%
- Metabolism: Nil
- Elimination half-life: 1 to 6 hours
- Excretion: Renal and fecal

Identifiers
- IUPAC name: (1-Hydroxyethan-1,1-diyl)bis(phosphonic acid)
- CAS Number: 2809-21-4
- PubChem CID: 3305
- IUPHAR/BPS: 7184
- DrugBank: DB01077
- ChemSpider: 3189
- UNII: M2F465ROXU
- KEGG: D02373
- ChEBI: CHEBI:4907
- ChEMBL: ChEMBL871
- CompTox Dashboard (EPA): DTXSID6023028
- ECHA InfoCard: 100.018.684

Chemical and physical data
- Formula: C_{2}H_{8}O_{7}P_{2}
- Molar mass: 206.027 g·mol^{−1}
- 3D model (JSmol): Interactive image
- SMILES: O=P(O)(O)C(O)(C)P(=O)(O)O
- InChI: InChI=1S/C2H8O7P2/c1-2(3,10(4,5)6)11(7,8)9/h3H,1H3,(H2,4,5,6)(H2,7,8,9); Key:DBVJJBKOTRCVKF-UHFFFAOYSA-N

Etidronic acid, also known as etidronate, is a bisphosphonate drug. It is non-nitrogenous bisphosphonate. It was patented in 1966 and approved for medical use in 1977. For medicinal purposes, etidronic acid has been obsolete since the early 2010's.

== Use ==
=== Medical ===
Etidronic acid is a bisphosphonate once used to strengthen bone, treat osteoporosis, and treat Paget's disease of bone.

Bisphosphonates primarily reduce osteoclastic activity, which prevents bone resorption, and thus moves the bone resorption/formation equilibrium toward the formation side and hence makes bone denser in the long run. Etidronate, unlike other bisphosphonates, also prevents bone calcification. For this reason, other bisphosphonates, such as alendronate, are preferred when fighting osteoporosis. To prevent bone resorption without affecting too much bone calcification, etidronate is administered only for a short time once in a while, for example for two weeks every 3 months. When given on a continuous basis, say every day, etidronate will altogether prevent bone calcification. This effect may be useful and etidronate was in fact used this way to fight heterotopic ossification. But in the long run, if used on a continuous basis, it will cause osteomalacia.

=== Chemical ===
Also known as 1-hydroxyethylidene-1,1-diphosphoic acid (HEDP), it is a versatile phosphonate compound known for its corrosion inhibition, chelating, and stabilizing properties, making it valuable across a range of industrial and consumer applications.

In industrial contexts, HEDP acts as a retardant of cement hydration in concrete, extending the dormant period before hardening begins. It is also used as a scale and corrosion inhibitor in circulating cooling water systems, oil fields, and low-pressure boilers, serving industries such as electric power, chemical manufacturing, metallurgy, and fertilizer production.

Beyond these applications, HEDP is utilized in the dyeing industry as a peroxide stabilizer and dye-fixing agent, and in non-cyanide electroplating where it functions as a chelating agent. In the light woven industry, it serves as a detergent for cleaning metal and non-metal surfaces and is often combined with polycarboxylic acids (superplasticizers) as a reducing agent. Typical dosages range from 1–10 mg/L for scale inhibition, 10–50 mg/L for corrosion inhibition, and 1000–2000 mg/L for detergent use.

As a chelating agent, HEDP binds to calcium, iron, and other metal ions, helping to reduce their potential environmental impact, particularly through greywater discharge into groundwater. Its phosphonate structure also imparts corrosion resistance to unalloyed steel, and it retards rancidification and oxidation of fatty acids.

In detergents and cleaning agents, HEDP and its salts help mitigate the adverse effects of hard water and stabilize peroxides during bleaching by inhibiting degradation caused by transition metals. Within the cosmetics industry, HEDP is used as a radical formation suppressant, emulsion stabilizer, and viscosity control agent. Although approved for use in cosmetic products, it is recommended that products containing HEDP, particularly soaps, be thoroughly rinsed from the skin after use.

HEDP also finds application in swimming pool maintenance, where it functions as a stain inhibitor by preventing metal ions from precipitating and staining pool surfaces.

== Pharmacology ==
Relative potency
Bisphosphonate	Relative potency
Etidronate	1
Tiludronate	10
Pamidronate	100
Alendronate	100-500
Ibandronate	500-1000
Risedronate	1000
Zoledronate	5000

== Synthesis ==
Etidronic acid can be prepared by reactions of dialkylphosphites and carboxylic acid anhydrides. Other precursors include phosphorus trichloride and phosphorous acid.
