= Alendronic acid =

Chemical compound

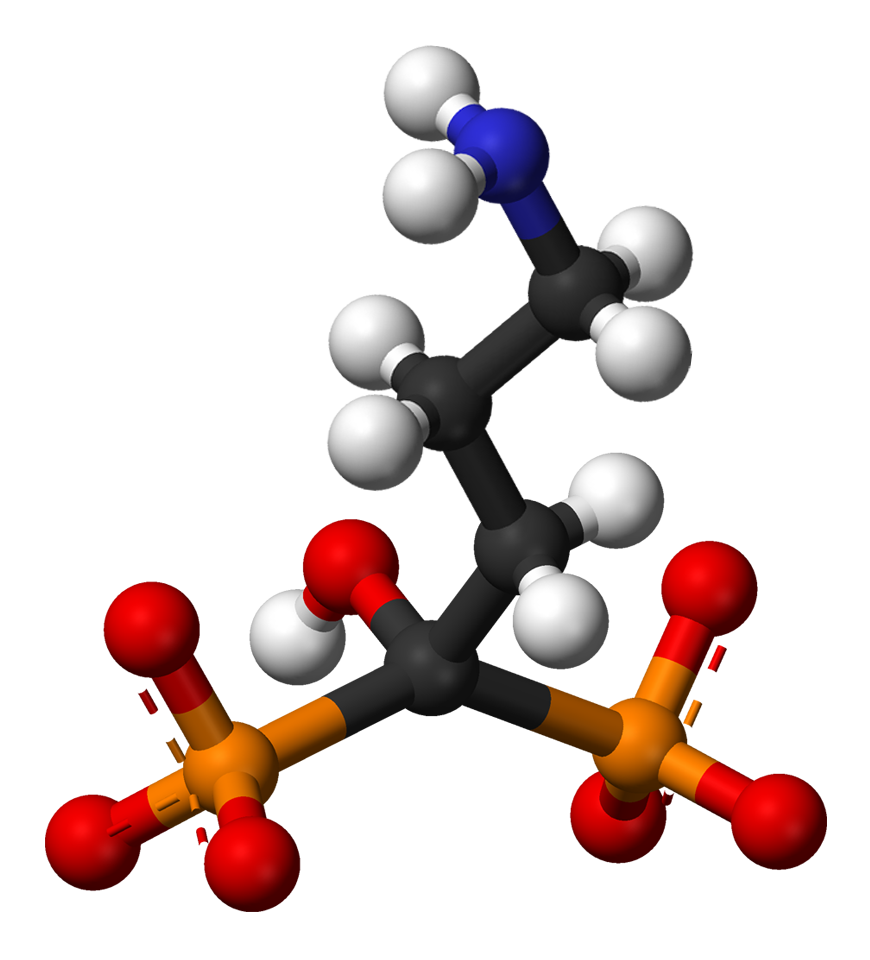

Clinical data
- Trade names: Fosamax, Binosto, others
- Other names: Alendronate, alendronate sodium (USAN US)
- AHFS/Drugs.com: Monograph
- MedlinePlus: a601011
- License data: US DailyMed: Alendronate sodium
- Pregnancy category: AU: B3
- Routes of administration: By mouth
- ATC code: M05BA04 (WHO)

Legal status
- Legal status: CA: ℞-only; UK: POM (Prescription only); US: ℞-only

Pharmacokinetic data
- Bioavailability: 0.6%
- Metabolism: excreted unchanged
- Elimination half-life: 126 months
- Excretion: Kidney

Identifiers
- IUPAC name: sodium [4-amino-1-hydroxy-1-(hydroxy-oxido-phosphoryl)- butyl]phosphonic acid trihydrate
- CAS Number: 66376-36-1; Sodium salt: 121268-17-5
- PubChem CID: 2088
- IUPHAR/BPS: 3141
- DrugBank: DB00630
- ChemSpider: 2004
- UNII: X1J18R4W8P; Sodium salt: 2UY4M2U3RA
- KEGG: D07119; Sodium salt: D00939
- ChEBI: CHEBI:2567
- ChEMBL: ChEMBL870
- CompTox Dashboard (EPA): DTXSID5022568
- ECHA InfoCard: 100.128.415

Chemical and physical data
- Formula: C_{4}H_{13}NO_{7}P_{2}
- Molar mass: 249.096 g·mol^{−1}
- 3D model (JSmol): Interactive image
- SMILES: O=P(O)(O)C(O)(CCCN)P(=O)(O)O
- InChI: InChI=1S/C4H13NO7P2/c5-3-1-2-4(6,13(7,8)9)14(10,11)12/h6H,1-3,5H2,(H2,7,8,9)(H2,10,11,12); Key:OGSPWJRAVKPPFI-UHFFFAOYSA-N

Alendronic acid or Alendronate, sold under the brand name Fosamax among others, is a bisphosphonate medication used to treat osteoporosis and Paget's disease of bone, which works by decreasing the activity of osteoclasts, the cells that break down bone. It is taken by mouth as the neutral sodium salt, alendronate sodium, but is absorbed as the active free drug alendronic acid. Use is often recommended together with vitamin D, calcium supplementation, and lifestyle changes.

Common side effects (1 to 10% of patients) include constipation, abdominal pain, nausea, and acid reflux; though the rate of all side effects were found by the Fracture Intervention Trial, which followed 2,027 women with osteoporosis for three years, to be nearly identical to that of the placebo. The study further found that the risk of a serious upper gastrointestinal adverse event was 60% lower (p<0.01) for the drug versus the placebo. Use is not recommended during pregnancy or in those with poor kidney function.

Alendronic acid was first described in 1978 and approved for medical use in the United States in 1995 as alendronate sodium (Fosamax). It is available as a generic medication. In 2023, it was the 113th most commonly prescribed medication in the United States, with more than 5 million prescriptions.

== Medical uses ==
Alendronate sodium is indicated for the treatment and prevention of osteoporosis in postmenopausal women; the treatment to increase bone mass in men with osteoporosis; the treatment of glucocorticoid-induced osteoporosis; and the treatment of Paget's disease of bone.

== Side effects ==
- Gastrointestinal tract:
  - Ulceration and possible rupture of the esophagus; this may require hospitalization and intensive treatment. Gastric and duodenal ulceration may also occur.
  - Esophageal cancer, a meta-analysis concluded that bisphosphonate treatment is not associated with excess risk of esophageal cancer.
- General: infrequent cases of skin rash, rarely manifesting as Stevens–Johnson syndrome and toxic epidermal necrolysis, eye problems (uveitis, scleritis) and generalized muscle, joint, and bone pain (rarely severe) have been reported.
- Osteonecrosis of the jaw (ONJ) may occur while on this drug, if dental work of any kind is carried out. The risk is considerably higher for extractions in the mandible (lower jaw) than other areas of the mouth, and the risk increases if you have been taking it for four or more years Although this side effect is uncommon (0.4-1.6% for oral alendronic acid), it occurs primarily in patients being administered intravenous bisphosphonates, with most cases being reported in cancer patients. In fact, while ONJ was demonstrated in the RCTs of the two IV bisphosphonates dosed at higher dose and more frequently in patients with cancer, ONJ was not seen in meta-analysis of all of the osteoporosis RCTs that comprised the Fosamax clinical development program, or in an FDA analysis of all of the RCTs of 2–10 years in duration comprising almost 100,00 patient-years of RCT data from the clinical development programs for alendronate sodium (Fosamax), risedronate sodium (Actonel) ibandronate sodium (oral Boniva), ibandronic acid (IV Boniva), and zoledronic acid (Reclast).
- Bone: alendronate has been linked in long-term users to the development of low-impact femoral fractures. Further, studies suggest that users of alendronate have an increase in the numbers of osteoclasts and develop giant, more multinucleated osteoclasts; the significance of this development is unclear. Fosamax has been linked to a rare type of leg fracture that cuts straight across the upper thigh bone after little or no trauma (subtrochanteric fractures).

== Pharmacology ==
=== Mechanism of action ===
Nitrogen containing bisphosphonates, which include ibandronate, pamidronate and alendronate exert their effects on osteoclasts mainly by inhibiting the synthesis of isoprenoid lipids such as isopentenyl diphosphate (IPP), farnesyl diphosphate (FPP), and geranylgeranyl diphosphate (GGPP) via the mevalonate pathway. These isoprenoids are used in posttranslational modification(prenylation) of small GTPases such as Ras, Rho, and Rac. These prenylated GTPases are necessary for various cellular processes including osteoclast morphology, endosome trafficking, and apoptosis. Alendronate has also been shown to impair the function of osteclast lysosomes.

Relative potency
Bisphosphonate	Relative potency
Etidronate	1
Tiludronate	10
Pamidronate	100
Alendronate	100-500
Ibandronate	500-1000
Risedronate	1000
Zoledronate	5000

=== Pharmacokinetics ===
The fraction of the drug that reaches the circulatory system intact (systemic bioavailability) after oral dosing is low, averaging only 0.6–0.7% in women and in men under fasting conditions. Intake together with meals and beverages other than water further reduces the bioavailability. The absorbed drug rapidly partitions, with approximately 50% binding to the exposed bone surface; the remainder is excreted unchanged by the kidneys. Unlike with most drugs, the strong negative charge on the two phosphonate moieties limits oral bioavailability, and, in turn, the exposure to tissues other than bone is very low. After absorption in the bone, alendronate has an estimated terminal elimination half-life of 10 years.
