= Bisphosphonate =

Pharmaceutical drugs for preventing bone loss

The general chemical structure of bisphosphonate. The R-groups determine the chemical properties of the drug, and distinguishes individual types of bisphosphonates. This chemical structure affords a high affinity for calcium hydroxyapatite, allowing for rapid and specific skeletal targeting.

Bisphosphonates are a class of drugs that prevent the loss of bone density. They are the most commonly prescribed to treat osteoporosis and similar diseases.

Specifically, there is evidence that shows they may reduce the risk of fracture in post-menopausal women with osteoporosis.

Bone tissue undergoes constant remodeling and is kept in balance (homeostasis) by osteoblasts creating bone and osteoclasts destroying bone. Bisphosphonates inhibit the digestion of bone by encouraging osteoclasts to undergo apoptosis, or cell death, thereby slowing bone loss.

The uses of bisphosphonates include the prevention and treatment of osteoporosis, Paget's disease of bone, bone metastasis (with or without hypercalcemia), multiple myeloma, primary hyperparathyroidism, osteogenesis imperfecta, fibrous dysplasia, and other conditions that exhibit bone fragility.

== Chemical structure and mechanistic aspects ==
The term bisphosphonate refers to the presence two phosphonate (PO_{2}(OH)^{−}) groups. They are also called diphosphonates (bis- or di- + phosphonate). The PO_{2}(OH)^{−} groups readily lose an additional proton, giving (PO^{2−}_{3} groups, which have a particularly high affinity for metal ions.

They are structurally close analogues of pyrophosphate (abbreviated PP_{i}).. Like pyrophosphate, bisphosphonates inhibit the growth and dissolution of bone. Unlike pyrophosphate, bis(phosphonates) are very stable in aqueous solution. They resist breakdown by hydrolysis because the P-C-P or P-N-P linkages are more robust than P-O-P linkages. Bis(phosponate)s are proposed to interfere with osteoclasts, which cause bone resorption.

== Medical uses ==
Bisphosphonates are used to treat osteoporosis, osteitis deformans (Paget's disease of the bone), bone metastasis (with or without hypercalcemia), multiple myeloma, and other conditions involving fragile, breakable bone.

In osteoporosis and Paget's, the most popular first-line bisphosphonate drugs are alendronate and risedronate. If these are ineffective or if the person develops digestive tract problems, intravenous pamidronate may be used. Strontium ranelate or teriparatide are used for refractory disease. The use of strontium ranelate is restricted because of increased risk of venous thromboembolism, pulmonary embolism and serious cardiovascular disorders, including myocardial infarction. In postmenopausal women, the selective estrogen receptor modulator raloxifene is occasionally administered instead of bisphosphonates. Bisphosphonates are beneficial in reducing the risk of vertebral fracture in steroid induced osteoporosis.

=== Post-menopausal osteoporosis ===
Bisphosphonates are recommended as a first line treatments for post-menopausal osteoporosis.

Long-term treatment with bisphosphonates produces anti-fracture and bone mineral density effects that persist for 3–5 years after an initial 3–5 years of treatment. The bisphosphonate alendronate reduces the risk of hip, vertebral, and wrist fractures by 35-39%; zoledronate reduces the risk of hip fractures by 38% and of vertebral fractures by 62%. Risedronate has also been shown to reduce the risk of hip fractures.

After five years of medications by mouth or three years of intravenous medication among those at low risk, bisphosphonate treatment can be stopped. In those at higher risk, ten years of medication by mouth or six years of intravenous treatment may be used.

=== Cancer ===
Bisphosphonates reduce the risk of fracture and bone pain in people with breast, lung, and other metastatic cancers as well as in people with multiple myeloma.

Bisphosphonates can exert some direct antitumor effect too. In breast cancer, there is mixed evidence regarding whether bisphosphonates improve survival. A 2017 Cochrane review found that for people with early breast cancer, bisphosphonate treatment may reduce the risk of the cancer spreading to the person's bone, however, for people who had advanced breast cancer bisphosphonate treatment did not appear to reduce the risk of the cancer spreading to the bone. Side effects associated with bisphosphonate treatment for people with breast cancer are mild and rare. Bisphosphonates can also reduce mortality in those with multiple myeloma and prostate cancer.

=== Other ===
Evidence suggests that the use of bisphosphonates would be useful in the treatment of complex regional pain syndrome, a neuro-immune problem with high MPQ scores, low treatment efficacy and symptoms which can include regional osteoporosis. In 2009, bisphosphonates were "among the only class of medications that have survived placebo-controlled studies showing statistically significant improvement (in CRPS) with therapy."

There is observational evidence and molecular explanation for some bisphosphonates offering a level of protection against COVID-19.

Bisphosphonates have been used to reduce fracture rates in children with the disease osteogenesis imperfecta and to treat otosclerosis by minimizing bone loss.

Other bisphosphonates, including medronate (R^{1}=H, R^{2}=H) and oxidronate (R^{1}=H, R^{2}=OH), are mixed with radioactive technetium and injected, as a way to image bone and detect bone disease.

== Adverse effects ==
=== Common ===
Oral bisphosphonates can cause upset stomach and inflammation and erosions of the esophagus, which is the main problem of oral N-containing preparations, that is, ones containing "normal" unbranched chains. This can be prevented by remaining seated upright for 30 to 60 minutes after taking the medication. Intravenous bisphosphonates can give fever and flu-like symptoms after the first infusion, which is thought to occur because of their potential to activate human γδ T cells.

Bisphosphonates, when administered intravenously for the treatment of cancer, have been associated with osteonecrosis of the jaw (ONJ), with the mandible twice as frequently affected as the maxilla and most cases occurring following high-dose intravenous administration used for some cancer patients. Phossy jaw has been described since Victorian times. Some 60% of cases are preceded by a dental surgical procedure (that involves the bone), and it has been suggested that bisphosphonate treatment should be postponed until after any dental work to eliminate potential sites of infection (the use of antibiotics may otherwise be indicated before any surgery).

Several cases of severe bone, joint, or musculoskeletal pain have been reported, prompting labeling changes.

Some studies have identified bisphosphonate use as a risk factor for atrial fibrillation (AF), though a meta-analysis of them found conflicting reports. As of 2008, the US Food and Drug Administration did not recommend any alteration in the prescribing of bisphosphonates based on AF concerns. More recent meta-analyses have found strong correlations between bisphosphonate use and development of AF, especially when administered intravenously, but that a significantly increased risk of AF that required hospitalization did not have an attendant increased risk of stroke or cardiovascular mortality.

=== Long-term risks ===
In large studies, women taking bisphosphonates for osteoporosis have had unusual fractures ("bisphosphonate fractures") in the femur (thigh bone) in the shaft (diaphysis or sub-trochanteric region) of the bone, rather than at the femoral neck, which is the most common site of fracture. However, these fractures are rare (12 in 14,195 women) compared to the common hip fractures (272 in 14,195 women), and the overall reduction in hip fractures caused by bisphosphonate is more than the increase in unusual shaft fractures. There are concerns that long-term bisphosphonate use can result in over-suppression of bone turnover. It is hypothesized that micro-cracks in the bone are unable to heal and eventually unite and propagate, resulting in atypical fractures. Such fractures tend to heal poorly and often require some form of bone stimulation, for example, bone grafting as a secondary procedure. This complication is uncommon, and the benefit of overall fracture reduction still holds. In cases where there is concern of such fractures occurring, teriparatide is potentially a good alternative because it does not cause as much damage as a bisphosphonate does by suppressing bone turnover.

Three meta-analyses have evaluated whether bisphosphonate use is associated with an increased risk of esophageal cancer. Two studies concluded that there was no evidence of increased risk.

== Chemistry and classes ==
All bisphosphonate drugs share a common phosphorus-carbon-phosphorus "backbone":

The two PO_{3} (phosphonate) groups covalently linked to carbon determine both the name "bisphosphonate" and the function of the drugs. Bis refers to the fact that there are two such groups in the molecule.

The long side-chain (R^{2} in the diagram) determines the chemical properties, the mode of action, and the strength of bisphosphonate drugs. The short side-chain (R^{1}), often called the 'hook', mainly influences chemical properties and pharmacokinetics.

See nitrogenous and non-nitrogenous sections in Mechanism of action below.

== Pharmacokinetics ==
Of the bisphosphonate that is resorbed (from oral preparation) or infused (for intravenous drugs), about 50% is excreted unchanged by the kidneys. The remainder has a very high affinity for bone tissue, and is rapidly adsorbed onto the bone surface. Once bisphosphonates are in bone, they have a very long elimination half-life that can exceed ten years.

The oral bioavailbility of bisphosphonates are generally quite low (less than 5%; 1% for nitrogen-containing ones) and easily compromised by divalent or trivalent cations such as calcium present in food. As a result, oral formulations generally need to be taken on an empty stomach, quite some time before any food is eaten. There is a special approved formulation of risedronate that does not require fasting.

== Mechanism of action ==
Bisphosphonates are structurally similar to pyrophosphate, but with a central carbon that can have up to two substituents (R^{1} and R^{2}) instead of an oxygen atom. Because a bisphosphonate group mimics the structure of pyrophosphate, it can inhibit activation of enzymes that utilize pyrophosphate.

The specificity of bisphosphonate-based drugs comes from the two phosphonate groups (and possibly a hydroxyl at R^{1}) that work together to coordinate calcium ions. Bisphosphonate molecules preferentially bind to calcium ions. The largest store of calcium in the human body is in bones, so bisphosphonates accumulate to a high concentration only in bones.

Bisphosphonates, when attached to bone tissue, are released by osteoclasts, the bone cells that break down bone tissue. Bisphosphonate molecules then attach to and enter osteoclasts where they disrupt intracellular enzymatic functions needed for bone resorption.

There are two classes of bisphosphonate compounds: non-nitrogenous (no nitrogen in R^{2}) and nitrogenous (R^{2} contains nitrogen). The two types of bisphosphonates work differently in inhibiting osteoclasts.

Class	Name	R^{1}	R^{2}	Relative potency (vs Etidronate=1)
Non-nitrogenous	Etidronate (Didronel)	OH	CH_{3}	1
Non-nitrogenous	Clodronate (Bonefos, Loron)	Cl	Cl	10
Non-nitrogenous	Tiludronate (Skelid)	H	p-Chlorophenylthio	10
Nitrogenous	Pamidronate (APD, Aredia)	OH	[CH_{2}]_{2}NH_{2}	100
Nitrogenous	Neridronate (Nerixia (Note: Not sold in the United States))	OH	[CH_{2}]_{5}NH_{2}	100
Nitrogenous	Olpadronate	OH	[CH_{2}]_{2}N(CH_{3})_{2}	500
Nitrogenous	Alendronate (Fosamax)	OH	[CH_{2}]_{3}NH_{2}	500
Nitrogenous	Ibandronate (Boniva - US, Bonviva - Asia)	OH	[CH_{2}]_{2}N(CH_{3})[CH_{2}]_{4}CH_{3}	1000
Nitrogenous	Risedronate (Actonel)	OH	3-Pyridylmethyl	2000
Nitrogenous	Zoledronate (Zometa, Aclasta)	OH	1H-imidazol-1-ylmethyl	10000

The nitrogenous types can be further divided into second- and third-generation types. The former includes those with an alkylamine R_{2} and the latter includes those with a nitrogen-containing heterocyclic R_{2}. Examples of the latter type include risedronate and zoledronate.

=== Non-nitrogenous ===
The non-nitrogenous bisphosphonates (diphosphonates) are metabolised in the cell to compounds that replace the terminal pyrophosphate moiety of ATP, forming a non-functional molecule that competes with adenosine triphosphate (ATP) in the cellular energy metabolism. The osteoclast initiates apoptosis and dies, leading to an overall decrease in the breakdown of bone. This type of bisphosphonate has overall more negative effects than the nitrogen containing group, and is prescribed far less often.

=== Nitrogenous ===
Nitrogenous bisphosphonates act on bone metabolism by binding and blocking the enzyme farnesyl diphosphate synthase (FPPS) in the HMG-CoA reductase pathway (also known as the mevalonate pathway).

Bisphosphonates that contain isoprene chains at the R^{1} or R^{2} position can impart specificity for inhibition of GGPS1.

HMG-CoA reductase pathway

Disruption of the HMG CoA-reductase pathway at the level of FPPS prevents the formation of two metabolites (farnesol and geranylgeraniol) that are essential for connecting some small proteins to the cell membrane. This phenomenon is known as prenylation, and is important for proper sub-cellular protein trafficking (see "lipid-anchored protein" for the principles of this phenomenon).

While inhibition of protein prenylation may affect many proteins found in an osteoclast, disruption to the lipid modification of the G protein families Ras, Rho, Rac has been speculated to underlie the effects of bisphosphonates. These proteins can affect osteoclastogenesis, cell survival, and cytoskeletal dynamics. In particular, the cytoskeleton is vital for maintaining the "ruffled border" that is required for contact between a resorbing osteoclast and a bone surface.

As a result of the many molecular consequences of FPPS inhibition, nitrogenous bisphosphonates induce apoptosis in osteoclasts. They also prevent the differentiation of osteoclasts. They possibly also help the survival and differentiation of osteoblasts.

Statins are another class of drugs that inhibit the HMG-CoA reductase pathway. Unlike bisphosphonates, statins do not bind to bone surfaces with high affinity, and thus are not specific for bone. Nevertheless, some studies have reported a decreased rate of fracture (an indicator of osteoporosis) and/or an increased bone mineral density in statin users. The overall efficacy of statins in the treatment of osteoporosis remains controversial.

== History ==
Bisphosphonates were developed in the 19th century but were first investigated in the 1960s for use in disorders of bone metabolism. Their non-medical use was to soften water in irrigation systems used in orange groves. The initial rationale for their use in humans was their potential in preventing the dissolution of hydroxylapatite, the principal bone mineral, thus arresting bone loss. In the 1990s their actual mechanism of action was demonstrated with the initial launch of alendronate by Merck & Co.
