= Hypoparathyroidism =

Endocrine disease

- Specialty: Endocrinology
- Symptoms: Hypocalcemia
- Medication: Recombinant human parathyroid hormone, palopegteriparatide

Hypoparathyroidism is decreased function of the parathyroid glands with underproduction of parathyroid hormone (PTH). This can lead to low levels of calcium in the blood, often causing cramping and twitching of muscles or tetany (involuntary muscle contraction), and several other symptoms. It is a very rare disease. The condition can be inherited, but it is also encountered after thyroid or parathyroid gland surgery, and it can be caused by immune system-related damage as well as several rarer causes. The diagnosis is made with blood tests, and other investigations such as genetic testing, depending on the results. The primary treatment of hypoparathyroidism is calcium and vitamin D supplementation. Calcium replacement or vitamin D can ameliorate the symptoms but can increase the risk of kidney stones and chronic kidney disease. Additionally, medications such as recombinant human parathyroid hormone or teriparatide may be given by injection to replace the missing hormone.

== Signs and symptoms ==
The main symptoms of hypoparathyroidism are the result of the low blood calcium level, which interferes with normal muscle contraction and nerve conduction. As a result, people with hypoparathyroidism can experience paresthesia, an unpleasant tingling sensation around the mouth and in the hands and feet, as well as muscle cramps and severe spasms known as "tetany" that affect the hands and feet. Many also report a number of subjective symptoms such as fatigue, headaches, bone pain and insomnia. Crampy abdominal pain may occur. Physical examination of someone with hypocalcemia may show tetany, but it is also possible to provoke tetany of the facial muscles by tapping on the facial nerve (a phenomenon known as Chvostek's sign) or by using the cuff of a sphygmomanometer to temporarily obstruct the blood flow to the arm (a phenomenon known as Trousseau's sign of latent tetany).

Several medical emergencies can arise in people with low calcium levels. These are seizures, severe irregularities in the normal heart beat (specifically prolongation of the QT interval), as well as spasm of the upper part of the airways or the smaller airways known as the bronchi (both potentially causing respiratory failure). Chronic hypoparathyroidism results in persistent low calcium with high phosphate in the body, which may present as calcification of the basal ganglia, associated with seizures, Parkinson's disease, and cognitive difficulties.

=== Related conditions ===
Condition		Appearance	PTH levels	Calcitriol	Calcium	Phosphates	Imprinting
Hypoparathyroidism		Normal	Low	Low	Low	High	Not applicable
Pseudohypoparathyroidism	Type 1A	Skeletal defects	High	Low	Low	High	Gene defect from mother (GNAS1)
Pseudohypoparathyroidism	Type 1B	Normal	High	Low	Low	High	Gene defect from mother (GNAS1 and STX16)
Pseudohypoparathyroidism	Type 2	Normal	High	Low	Low	High	?
Pseudopseudohypoparathyroidism		Skeletal defects	Normal	Normal	Normal	Normal	Gene defect from father

== Causes ==
Hypoparathyroidism can have the following causes:

- Removal of, or trauma to, the parathyroid glands due to anterior neck surgery (including thyroid surgery) (thyroidectomy), parathyroid surgery (parathyroidectomy). This is the most common cause of hypoparathyroidism, with 78% of cases of hypoparathyroidism arising due to a complication of anterior neck surgery. Although surgeons generally make attempts to spare normal parathyroid glands at surgery, inadvertent injury to the glands or their blood supply is still common. When this happens, the parathyroids may cease functioning. This is usually temporary, but occasionally long-term (permanent). Hypoparathyroidism may occur as a complication in up to 8% of anterior neck surgeries, with 75% of those resolving by 6 months, and 25% of those having permanent hypoparathyroidism.
- Kenny–Caffey syndrome
- Autoimmune invasion and destruction is the most common non-surgical cause. It can occur as part of autoimmune polyendocrine syndromes.
- Hemochromatosis can lead to iron accumulation and consequent dysfunction of several endocrine organs, including the parathyroids.
- Absence or dysfunction of the parathyroid glands is one of the components of chromosome 22q11 microdeletion syndrome (also known as DiGeorge syndrome, Shprintzen syndrome, or velocardiofacial syndrome).
- Magnesium deficiency
- A defect in the calcium receptor leads to a rare congenital form of the disease
- Idiopathic (of unknown cause)
- Occasionally, due to other hereditary causes (e.g., Barakat syndrome (HDR syndrome), a genetic development disorder resulting in hypoparathyroidism, sensorineural deafness, and kidney disease)

== Mechanism ==
The parathyroid glands are so named because they are usually located behind the thyroid gland in the neck. They arise during fetal development from structures known as the third and fourth pharyngeal pouch. The glands, usually four in number, contain the parathyroid chief cells that sense the level of calcium in the blood through the calcium-sensing receptor and secrete parathyroid hormone. Magnesium is required for PTH secretion. Under normal circumstances, the parathyroid glands secrete PTH to maintain a calcium level within normal limits, as calcium is required for adequate muscle and nerve function (including the autonomic nervous system).

PTH acts on several organs to regulate calcium and phosphorus levels. PTH acts on the kidneys to increase calcium reabsorption into the blood and to inhibit phosphorus reabsorption (which causes phosphorus to be lost in the urine). It increases calcium and phosphorus absorption in the bowel indirectly by stimulating the kidneys to produce vitamin D which then acts on the gut. PTH also causes increase bone resorption which leads to the releases calcium and phosphorus into the blood.

== Diagnosis ==
Diagnosis is by measurement of calcium, serum albumin (for correction), and PTH in blood. If necessary, measuring cAMP (cyclic AMP) in the urine after an intravenous dose of PTH can help in the distinction between hypoparathyroidism and other causes.

Differential diagnoses are:

- Pseudohypoparathyroidism (normal PTH levels but tissue insensitivity to the hormone, associated with intellectual disability and skeletal deformities) and pseudopseudohypoparathyroidism.
- Vitamin D deficiency or hereditary insensitivity to this vitamin (X-linked dominant).
- Malabsorption
- Kidney disease
- Medication: steroids, diuretics, some antiepileptics.

Other tests include ECG for abnormal heart rhythms, and measurement of blood magnesium levels.

== Treatment ==
Severe hypocalcaemia, a potentially life-threatening condition, is treated as soon as possible with intravenous calcium (e.g., as calcium gluconate). Calcium gluconate can be given via a peripheral IV; however, other calcium formulations require infusion via a central venous catheter as the calcium can irritate peripheral veins and cause phlebitis. Precautions are taken to prevent seizures or larynx spasms. The heart is monitored for abnormal rhythms during IV treatment, as calcium may affect cardiac conduction. When the life-threatening attack has been controlled, the person is then transitioned to long-term therapy with oral or subcutaneous injection medications.

Long-term treatment of hypoparathyroidism is with vitamin D analogs (such as calcitriol or alfacalcidol), vitamin D supplementation and calcium supplementation. Potential risks of treatment for hypoparathyroidism include hypercalcemia and hypercalciuria (elevated calcium in the urine) which may lead to kidney calcification (nephrocalcinosis) and chronic kidney disease. Calcium levels in the blood and urine (along with other electrolytes) must be monitored during long-term treatment of hypoparathyroidism and blood calcium levels are intentionally kept at the lower limits of normal, or mildly low, specifically to avoid hypercalciuria, kidney calcification and kidney damage.

Recombinant human parathyroid hormone and teriparatide (which consists of the first N-terminal 34 amino acids of parathyroid hormone, the bioactive portion of the hormone)(PTH 1-34) may be used as a second line therapy in those that have not responded to conventional therapy. Both medications may be given via subcutaneous injections, but the use of pump delivery of synthetic PTH 1-34 provides the closest approach to physiologic PTH replacement therapy. Recombinant human parathyroid hormone and teriparatide are also associated with a risk of hypercalcemia, hypercalciuria with associated kidney calcification and kidney damage. If these medications are discontinued, they should be tapered, and calcium levels should be closely monitored, as the transient PTH depletion after stopping the medications can lead to bone leaching of calcium as a compensatory mechanism to increase calcium levels.

A 2019 systematic review has highlighted that, because of the research gap in recent rigorous studies, there is a lack of high-quality evidence for the use of vitamin D, calcium, or recombinant parathyroid hormone in the management of both temporary and long-term hypoparathyroidism following thyroidectomy.

Kidney ultrasound may be considered periodically to assess for any nephrocalcinosis for those on long-term therapy for hypoparathyroidism.

== See also ==
- Hyperparathyroidism
