= Parathyroid hormone 2 =

Protein-coding gene in the species Homo sapiens

PTH2

Identifiers
- Aliases: PTH2, TIP39, parathyroid hormone 2
- External IDs: OMIM: 608386; MGI: 2152297; GeneCards: PTH2

Gene location (Human)
Chr.	Chromosome 19 (human)
Band	19q13.33	Start	49,422,419 bp
Band	19q13.33	End	49,423,441 bp

Gene location (Mouse)
Chr.	Chromosome 7 (mouse)
Band	7|7 B3	Start	44,830,419 bp
Band	7|7 B3	End	44,831,262 bp
RNA expression pattern
Bgee	Human / Mouse (ortholog); Top expressed in: secondary oocyte; rhombencephalon; metencephalon; cerebellum; cerebellar cortex; cerebellar hemisphere; gonad; right hemisphere of cerebellum; sensory nervous system; occipital lobe / Top expressed in: olfactory epithelium; seminiferous tubule; embryo; tibiofemoral joint; spermatid; neural layer of retina; lumbar spinal ganglion; olfactory bulb; spermatocyte; artery; More reference expression data
BioGPS	n/a
Orthologs
Databases	NCBI: entry; OMA: entry
Species	Human	Mouse
Entrez	113091	114640
Ensembl	ENSG00000142538	ENSMUSG00000038300
UniProt	Q96A98	Q91W27
RefSeq (mRNA)	NM_178449	NM_053256
RefSeq (protein)	NP_848544	NP_444486
Location (UCSC)	Chr 19: 49.42 – 49.42 Mb	Chr 7: 44.83 – 44.83 Mb
PubMed search
- Wikidata
View/Edit Human	View/Edit Mouse

Parathyroid hormone 2 (or PTH2), also called TIP39, is a protein that in humans is encoded by the PTH2 gene.

Parathyroid hormone 2 is related to parathyroid hormone and parathyroid hormone-related protein and is a ligand for the parathyroid hormone 2 receptor (PTH2R).

The molecular interaction of PTH2 with the PTH2R has been characterized in full 3D molecular detail, identifying among other residues, Tyr-318 in transmembrane helix 5 as a key residue for high affinity binding

Expression of PTH2 has been linked to social interaction in both zebrafish and rats. In these species, mutations of PTH2 or PTH2R lead to abnormal social behavior.
