= Jansen's metaphyseal chondrodysplasia =

Rare genetic disorder involving dwarfism and endocrine symptoms

- Other names: Murk Jansen-type metaphyseal chondrodysplasia, Jansen metaphyseal dysostosis, Jansen disease
- Jansen's metaphyseal chondrodysplasia is inherited in an autosomal dominant manner.

Jansen's metaphyseal chondrodysplasia (JMC) is a disease that results from ligand-independent activation of the type 1 (PTH1R) of the parathyroid hormone receptor, due to one of three reported mutations (activating mutation).

JMC is extremely rare, and as of 2007 there are fewer than 20 reported cases worldwide. There are only 2 known families, from Dubai and Texas, in which the disease was passed from mother to daughter (Texas), and from a mother to her 2 sons (Dubai).

== Presentation and genetics ==
Blood levels of parathyroid hormone (PTH) are undetectable, but the mutation in the PTH1R leads to auto-activation of the signaling as though the hormone PTH is present. Severe JMC produces a dwarfing phenotype, or short stature. Examination of the bone reveals normal epiphyseal plates but disorganized metaphyseal regions. Hypercalcemia (elevated levels of calcium in the blood) and hypophosphatemia (reduced blood levels of phosphate), and elevated urinary calcium and phosphate, are generally found in JMC. The absence of hypercalcemia does not eliminate the disease from consideration.

Physical irregularities often associated with Jansen's include: prominent or protruding eyes, a high-arched palate, micrognathia or abnormal smallness of the jaws – particularly the lower (mandible) jaw, choanal stenosis, wide cranial sutures and irregular formation of the long bones which can resemble rickets. Nephrocalcinosis (accumulation of calcium in the renal interstitium) is seen commonly as well.

== Clinical features ==
Individuals with JMC typically present with short stature, bowed legs, and widened growth plates. Other features may include hypercalcemia, joint pain, and muscle weakness. The severity of symptoms can vary widely among affected individuals.

== Cause ==
Jansen's metaphyseal chondrodysplasia is caused by a mutation in the PTH1R gene. Most cases are due to a spontaneous mutation. Inheritance is autosomal dominant.

== Diagnosis ==
Diagnosis typically occurs during infancy or early childhood and is based around physical characteristics and symptoms. X-rays may reveal abnormal development of the bulbous ends of the metaphyses of the limb bones. Tests that detect hypercalciuria and hypercalcaemia are also helpful in the diagnosis.

== Treatment ==
There is no known treatment at present, although some investigators have tried to lessen the hypercalcemia with various forms of bisphosphonates. Treatment is symptomatic and may include physical therapy, orthopedic interventions, and management of hypercalcemia. Regular monitoring of growth and skeletal development is essential for managing the condition.

== Eponym ==
It is named for Murk Jansen (1867–1935), a Dutch orthopedic surgeon.
