= Parathyroid hormone 2 receptor =

Protein-coding gene in the species Homo sapiens

PTH2R

Identifiers
- Aliases: PTH2R, PTHR2, parathyroid hormone 2 receptor
- External IDs: OMIM: 601469; MGI: 2180917; GeneCards: PTH2R

Gene location (Human)
Chr.	Chromosome 2 (human)
Band	2q34	Start	208,359,714 bp
Band	2q34	End	208,854,503 bp

Gene location (Mouse)
Chr.	Chromosome 1 (mouse)
Band	1 C3|1 33.05 cM	Start	65,321,215 bp
Band	1 C3|1 33.05 cM	End	65,428,403 bp
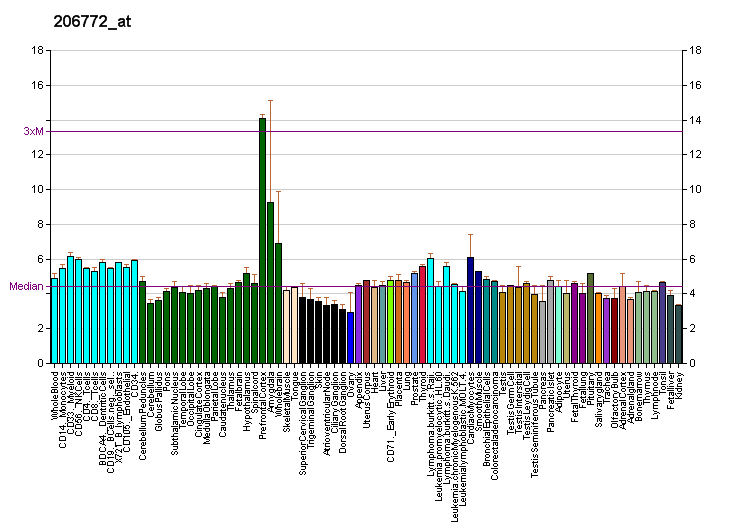
RNA expression pattern
Bgee	Human / Mouse (ortholog); Top expressed in: endothelial cell; testicle; human kidney; secondary oocyte; islet of Langerhans; Brodmann area 9; prefrontal cortex; right frontal lobe; Brodmann area 23; middle temporal gyrus / Top expressed in: medial geniculate nucleus; spermatid; embryo; embryo; lumbar spinal ganglion; blastocyst; medial dorsal nucleus; medial ganglionic eminence; neural tube; lumbar subsegment of spinal cord; More reference expression data
BioGPS	More reference expression data
Gene ontology
Molecular function	protein binding; G protein-coupled receptor activity; parathyroid hormone receptor activity; transmembrane signaling receptor activity; signal transducer activity; G protein-coupled peptide receptor activity; peptide hormone binding
Cellular component	integral component of membrane; plasma membrane; integral component of plasma membrane; membrane
Biological process	G protein-coupled receptor signaling pathway; cell surface receptor signaling pathway; signal transduction; positive regulation of cold-induced thermogenesis
Sources:Amigo / QuickGO
Orthologs
Databases	NCBI: entry; OMA: entry
Species	Human	Mouse
Entrez	5746	213527
Ensembl	ENSG00000144407	ENSMUSG00000025946
UniProt	P49190	Q91V95
RefSeq (mRNA)	NM_001309516; NM_005048	NM_139270
RefSeq (protein)	NP_001296445; NP_005039; NP_001358834; NP_001358835; NP_001358836	NP_644676
Location (UCSC)	Chr 2: 208.36 – 208.85 Mb	Chr 1: 65.32 – 65.43 Mb
PubMed search
- Wikidata
View/Edit Human	View/Edit Mouse

Parathyroid hormone 2 receptor is a protein that in humans is encoded by the PTH2R gene.

== Function ==
The protein encoded by this gene is a member of the G protein-coupled receptor family 2. This protein is a receptor for parathyroid hormone (PTH) and parathyroid hormone 2 (PTH2). PTH2R is more selective in ligand recognition than the parathyroid hormone 1 receptor, and in particular is not activated by parathyroid hormone-related protein (PTHrP). It also has a more specific tissue distribution, and is particularly abundant in the brain and pancreas.

The molecular interaction of PTH2R with the peptide PTH2 (previously TIP39) has been characterized in full 3D molecular detail, identifying among other residues Tyr-318 in transmembrane helix 5 as a key residue for high affinity binding.

== Mechanism ==
It is a member of the secretin family of G protein-coupled receptors. The activity of this receptor is mediated by G_{s} protein, which activates adenylyl cyclase.

== See also ==
- Parathyroid hormone receptor
