= Metabolic disorder =

Any disease hindering the body's ability to process and distribute nutrients

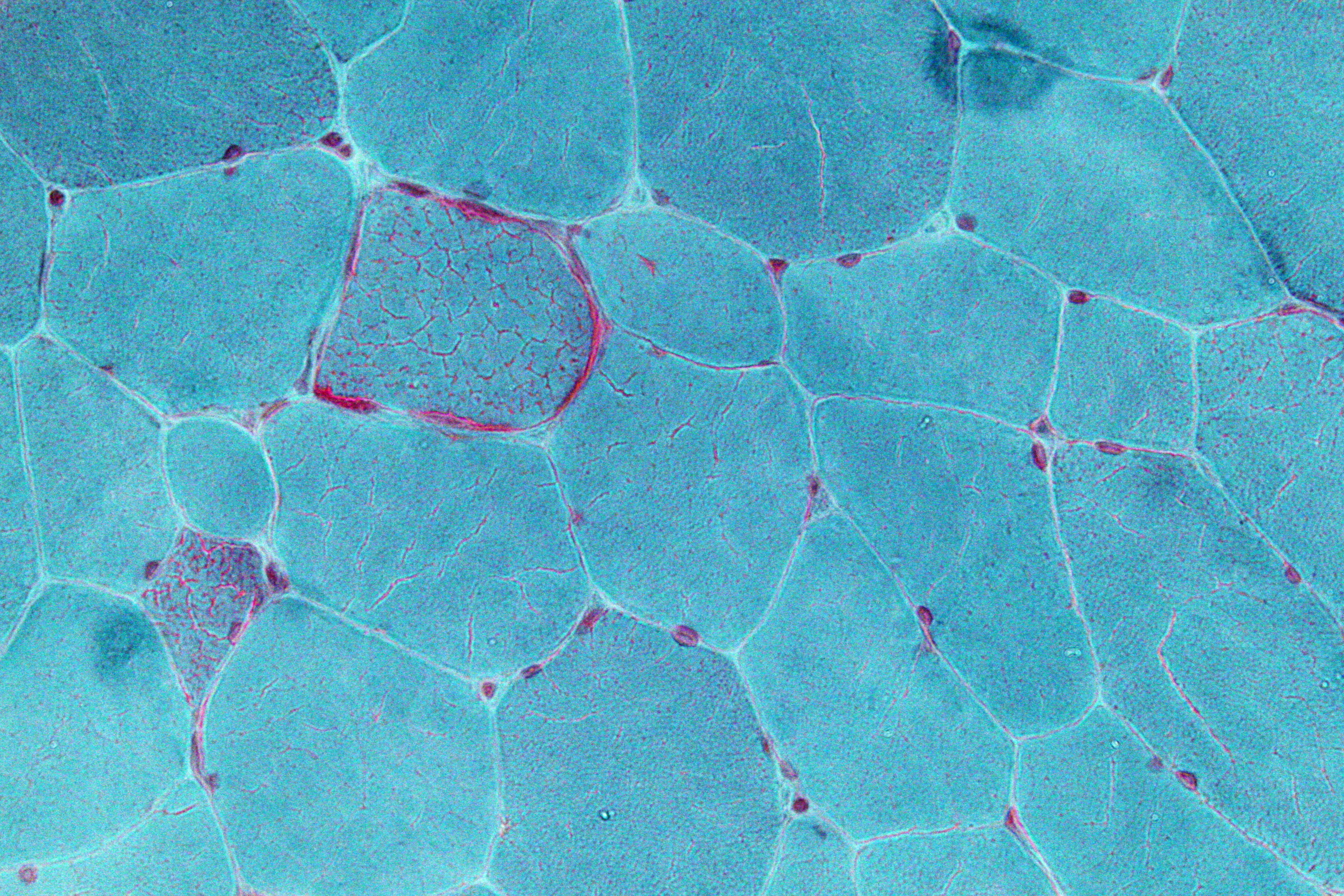
- Example of mitochondrial disease
- Specialty: Endocrinology
- Types: Calcium metabolism disorders, Acid-base imbalance, Metabolic brain diseases
- Diagnostic method: DNA test
- Treatment: Variable (see types)

A metabolic disorder is a disorder that negatively alters the body's processing and distribution of macronutrients, such as proteins, fats, and carbohydrates. Metabolic disorders can happen when abnormal chemical reactions in the body alter the normal metabolic process. It can also be defined as inherited single gene anomaly, most of which are autosomal recessive.

== Signs and symptoms ==
Some of the symptoms that can occur with metabolic disorders are lethargy, weight loss, jaundice and seizures. The symptoms expressed would vary with the type of metabolic disorder. There are four categories of symptoms: acute symptoms, late-onset acute symptoms, progressive general symptoms and permanent symptoms.

== Causes ==
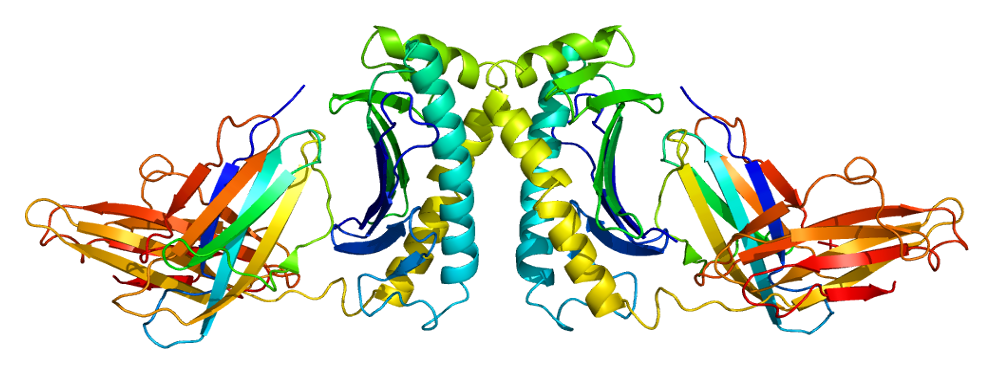
Protein involved in Iron metabolism disorder (HFE)

Inherited metabolic disorders are one cause of metabolic disorders, and occur when a defective gene causes an enzyme deficiency. These diseases, of which there are many subtypes, are known as inborn errors of metabolism. Metabolic diseases can also occur when the liver or pancreas do not function properly.

=== Types ===
The principal classes of metabolic disorders are:

- Acid–base imbalance
- Metabolic brain diseases
- Disorders of calcium metabolism
- DNA repair-deficiency disorders
- Glucose metabolism disorders
- Hyperlactatemia
- Iron metabolism disorders
- Lipid metabolism disorders
- Malabsorption syndromes
- Metabolic syndrome X
- Inborn error of metabolism
- Mitochondrial diseases
- Phosphorus metabolism disorders
- Porphyrias
- Proteostasis deficiencies
- Metabolic skin diseases
- Wasting syndrome
- Water-electrolyte imbalance

== Diagnosis ==
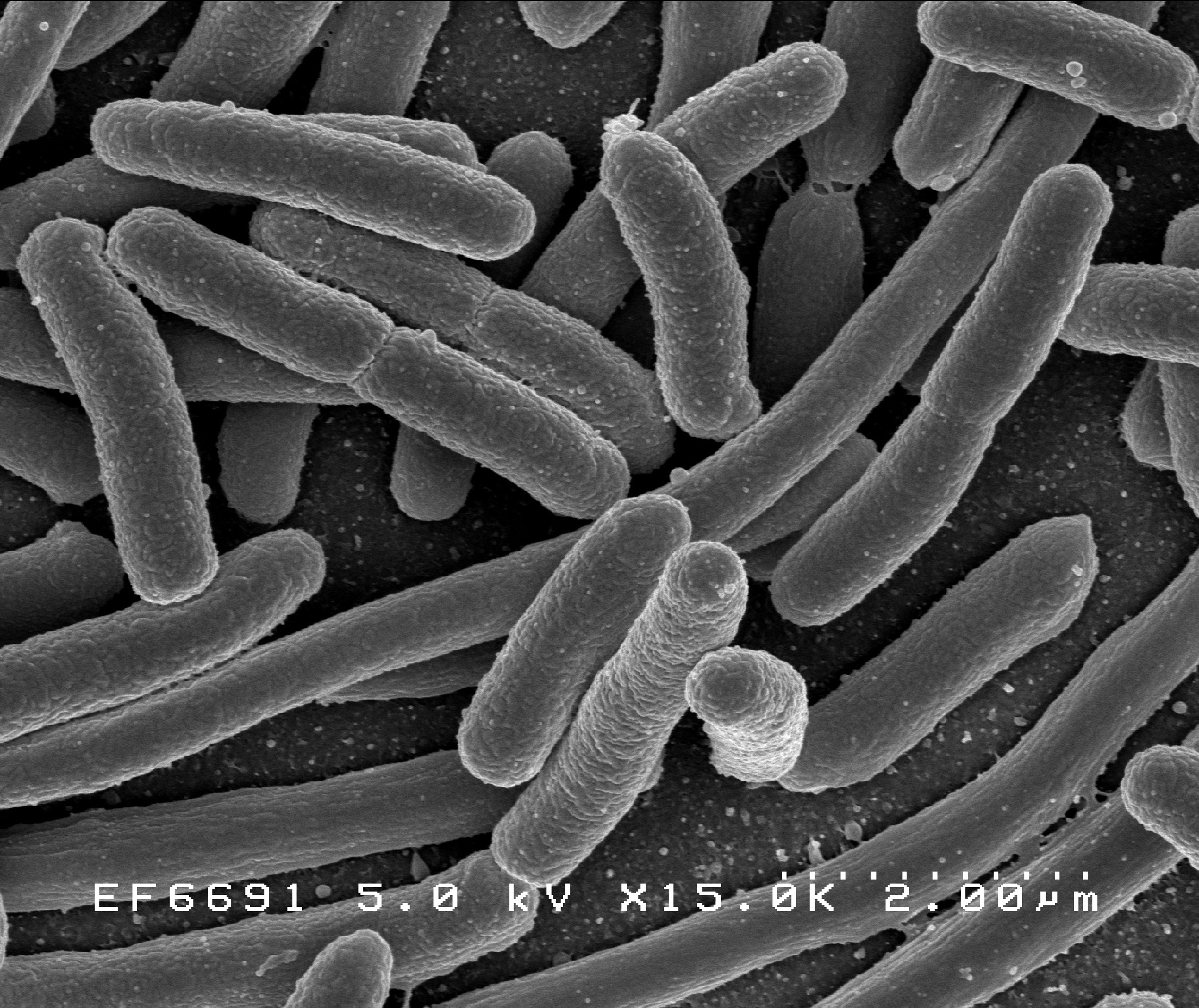
Gut microbiota

Metabolic disorders can be present at birth, and many can be identified by routine screening. If a metabolic disorder is not identified early, then it may be diagnosed later in life, when symptoms appear. Specific blood and DNA tests can be done to diagnose genetic metabolic disorders.

The gut microbiota, which is a population of microbes that live in the human digestive system, also has an important part in metabolism and generally has a positive function for its host. In terms of pathophysiological/mechanism interactions, an abnormal gut microbiota can play a role in metabolic disorder related obesity.

== Screening ==
Metabolic disorder screening can be done in newborns via blood, skin, or hearing tests.

== Management ==
Metabolic disorders can be treatable by nutrition management, especially if detected early. It is important for dieticians to have knowledge of the genotype to create a treatment that will be more effective for the individual.

== See also ==
- Metabolic syndrome
- Metabolic Myopathies
- Lysosomal storage disease
- Deficiency disease
- Hypermetabolism
- Citrullinemia
