= Disorders of calcium metabolism =

- Calcium
- Specialty: Endocrinology

Disorders of calcium metabolism occur when the body has too little or too much calcium. The serum level of calcium is closely regulated within a fairly limited range in the human body. In a healthy physiology, extracellular calcium levels are maintained within a tight range through the actions of parathyroid hormone, vitamin D and the calcium sensing receptor. Disorders in calcium metabolism can lead to hypocalcemia, decreased plasma levels of calcium or hypercalcemia, elevated plasma calcium levels.

== Hypocalcemia ==
Hypocalcemia is common and can occur unnoticed with no symptoms or, in severe cases, can have dramatic symptoms and be life-threatening. Hypocalcemia can be parathyroid related or vitamin D related. Parathyroid related hypocalcemia includes post-surgical hypoparathyroidism, inherited hypoparathyroidism, pseudohypoparathyroidism, and pseudo-pseudohypoparathyroidism. Post-surgical hypoparathyroidism is the most common form, and can be temporary (due to suppression of tissue after removal of a malfunctioning gland) or permanent, if all parathyroid tissue has been removed. Inherited hypoparathyroidism is rare and is due to a mutation in the calcium sensing receptor. Pseudohypoparathyroidism is maternally inherited and is categorized by hypocalcemia and hyperphosphatemia. Finally, pseudo-pseudohypoparathyroidism is paternally inherited. Patients display normal parathyroid hormone action in the kidney, but exhibit altered parathyroid hormone action in the bone. Vitamin D related hypocalcemia may be associated with a lack of vitamin D in the diet, a lack of sufficient UV exposure, or disturbances in renal function. Low vitamin D in the body can lead to a lack of calcium absorption and secondary hyperparathyroidism (hypocalcemia and raised parathyroid hormone). Symptoms of hypocalcemia include numbness in fingers and toes, muscle cramps, irritability, impaired mental capacity and muscle twitching.

== Hypercalcemia ==
Hypercalcemia is suspected to occur in approximately 1 in 500 adults in the general adult population. Like hypocalcemia, hypercalcemia can be non-severe and present with no symptoms, or it may be severe, with life-threatening symptoms. Hypercalcemia is most commonly caused by hyperparathyroidism and by malignancy, and less commonly by vitamin D intoxication, familial hypocalciuric hypercalcemia and by sarcoidosis. Hyperparathyroidism occurs most commonly in postmenopausal women. Hyperparathyroidism can be caused by a tumor, or adenoma, in the parathyroid gland or by increased levels of parathyroid hormone due to hypocalcemia. Approximately 10% of individuals with cancer experience hypercalcemia due to malignancy. Hypercalcemia occurs most commonly in breast cancer, lymphoma, prostate cancer, thyroid cancer, lung cancer, myeloma, and colon cancer. It may be caused by secretion of parathyroid hormone-related peptide by the tumor (which has the same action as parathyroid hormone), or may be a result of direct invasion of the bone, causing calcium release. Symptoms of hypercalcemia include anorexia, nausea, vomiting, constipation, abdominal pain, lethargy, depression, confusion, polyuria, polydipsia and generalized aches and pains.

== Plasma Calcium ==
The amount of biologically active calcium varies with the level of serum albumin, a protein to which calcium is bound, and therefore levels of ionized calcium are better measures than a total calcium; however, one can correct a total calcium if the albumin level is known.

- A normal ionized calcium is 1.12-1.45 mmol/L (4.54-5.61 mg/dL).
- A normal total calcium is 2.2-2.6 mmol/L (9-10.5 mg/dl).
  - Total calcium of less than 8.0 mg/dL is hypocalcaemia, with levels below 1.59 mmol/L (6 mg/dL) generally fatal.
  - Total calcium of more than 10.6 mg/dL is hypercalcaemia, with levels over 3.753 mmol/L (15.12 mg/dL) generally fatal.

== See also ==
- Calcium metabolism
- Milk-alkali syndrome
