= Osteomimicry =

Osteomimicry occurs when cancer cells begin to express genes normally restricted to cells present within the bone. These genes include osteocalcin, osteopontin, bone sialoprotein, osteonectin, RANK ligand (NF-κB receptor activator) and parathyroid hormone related peptide (PTHrP). This change in gene expression allows cancer cells to avoid detection by the immune system and establish colonies in the bone microenvironment. Cancer cells expressing these genes secrete normal bone ECM protein products, abnormally altering the bone matrix and activity of osteoblasts and osteoclasts in the local microenvironment.

== Sources ==
- Chung, L. (2007). Prostate Cancer: Biology, Genetics and the New Therapeutics, Humana Press.
