= Blomstrand =

Blomstrand is a surname. Notable people with the surname include:

- Christian Wilhelm Blomstrand (1826–1897), Swedish mineralogist and chemist
- Christofer Blomstrand (born 1991), Swedish professional golfer
- Hanna Blomstrand (born 1996), Swedish handball player
- Ludwig Blomstrand (born 1993), Swedish professional ice hockey player

== See also ==
- Chondrodysplasia Blomstrand, a rare genetic disorder
