= Recombinant human parathyroid hormone =

Pharmaceutical drug

Clinical data
- Trade names: Preotact, Natpara, Natpar
- AHFS/Drugs.com: Monograph
- MedlinePlus: a617013
- License data: US DailyMed: Parathyroid hormone
- Routes of administration: Subcutaneous
- Drug class: Hormonal agent
- ATC code: H05AA03 (WHO)

Legal status
- Legal status: US: ℞-only; EU: Rx-only; In general: ℞ (Prescription only)

Identifiers
- CAS Number: 9002-64-6
- DrugBank: DB05829
- UNII: N19A0T0E5J
- KEGG: D05364

Chemical and physical data
- Formula: C_{408}H_{674}N_{126}O_{126}S_{2}
- Molar mass: 9424.76 g·mol^{−1}

Recombinant human parathyroid hormone is an artificially manufactured form of the parathyroid hormone used to help treat hypoparathyroidism (under-active parathyroid glands) and osteoporosis.

Recombinant human parathyroid hormone (Preotact) received market authorization in the European Union in April 2006 to treat osteoporosis in postmenopausal women at high risk of fractures. Preotact marketing authorisation was later voluntarily withdrawn in 2014 by the holder NPS Pharma. FDA approval (as Preos) was not granted in the US for the same indication due to hypercalcemia and injection device issues.

Recombinant human parathyroid hormone (Natpara) was approved for medical use in the United States in January 2015, and received (as Natpar) conditional market authorization in the European Union in February 2017 as orphan drug. On 2019 Natpara was recalled in the US due to rubber particle issues emerging from daily use of the cartridge. Takeda announced in 2022 its decision to stop manufacturing Natpara/Natpar globally at the end of 2024.

== Medical uses ==
Recombinant human parathyroid hormone (Natpara) is indicated as an adjunct to calcium and vitamin D to control hypocalcemia in people with hypoparathyroidism. Recombinant human parathyroid hormone (Natpar) is indicated as adjunctive treatment of adults with chronic hypoparathyroidism who cannot be adequately controlled with standard therapy alone.

Recombinant human parathyroid hormone (Preotact) is indicated for the treatment of osteoporosis in postmenopausal women at high risk of fractures, but the marketing authorization has been withdrawn at the manufacturer's request.

== Contraindications ==
Parathyroid hormone treatment should not be initiated in patients:

- with hypersensitivity to PTH or excipients
- who have received radiation therapy to the skeleton
- with pre-existing hypercalcemia and other disturbances in the metabolism of phosphate or calcium
- with metabolic bone diseases other than primary osteoporosis (including hyperparathyroidism and Paget's disease)
- with unexplained elevations of bone-specific alkaline phosphatase
- with severe chronic kidney disease
- with severe liver impairment

=== Adverse effects ===
The most common side effects include too high or too low blood calcium levels, which can lead to headache, diarrhea, vomiting, paraesthesia (unusual sensations like pins and needles), hypoaesthesia (reduced sense of touch), and high calcium levels in the urine.

In the US, the FDA label for parathyroid hormone contains a black box warning for osteosarcoma (a malignant bone tumor).

== Interactions ==
Parathyroid hormone is a natural peptide that is not metabolised in the liver. It is not protein bound and has a low volume of distribution, therefore no specific drug-drug interactions are suspected. From the knowledge of the mechanism of action, combined use of Preotact and cardiac glycosides may predispose patients to digitalis toxicity if hypercalcemia develops.

== Undesirable effects ==
Hypercalcemia and/or hypercalciuria reflect the known pharmacodynamic actions of parathyroid hormone in the gastrointestinal tract, the kidney and the skeleton, and is therefore an expected undesirable effect. Nausea is another commonly reported adverse reaction to the use of parathyroid hormone.

== Pharmacodynamic properties ==
=== Mechanism of action ===
Preotact contains recombinant human parathyroid hormone which is identical to the full-length native 84-amino acid polypeptide. Physiological actions of parathyroid hormone include stimulation of bone formation by direct effects on bone forming cells (osteoblasts) indirectly increasing the intestinal absorption of calcium and increasing the tubular reabsorption of calcium and excretion of phosphate by the kidney.

Full-length human parathyroid hormone

=== Pharmacodynamic effects ===
The skeletal effects of parathyroid hormone depend upon the pattern of systemic exposure. Transient elevations in parathyroid hormone levels after subcutaneous injection of Preotact stimulates new bone formation on trabecular and cortical bone surfaces by preferential stimulation of osteoblastic activity over osteoclastic activity.

=== Effects on serum calcium concentrations ===
Parathyroid hormone is the principal regulator of serum calcium hemostasis. In response to subcutaneous doses of Preotact (100 micrograms), serum total calcium levels increase gradually and reach peak concentration at approximately 6 to 8 hours after dosing. In general, serum calcium levels return to normal within 24 hours.

=== Clinical efficacy ===
In an 18-month double-blind, placebo controlled study, the effects of Preotact on the fracture incidence in 2532 women with postmenopausal osteoporosis was studied. Approximately 19% of patients had a prevalent vertebral fracture at baseline and the mean lumbar T-score of -3.0 in both active and placebo arm. Compared to the placebo group, there was a 61% relative risk reduction of a new vertebral fracture at month 18 for the women in the Preotact group. To prevent one or more new vertebral fractures, 48 women had to be treated for a median of 18 months for the total population. For patients who were already fractured, the number needed to treat was 21.

=== Effect on bone mineral density ===
In the same study mentioned above, Preotact increased bone mineral density in the lumbar spine after 18 months treatment by 6.5% compared with a reduction by 0.3% in the placebo group. The difference was statistically significant. The increase of bone mineral density in the hip was also statistically significant compared to placebo, but only around 1.0% at study endpoint. Continued treatment up to 24 months lead to a continued increase in bone mineral density.

== Pharmacokinetics ==
=== Absorption ===
Subcutaneous administration of parathyroid hormone into the abdomen produces a rapid increase in plasma parathyroid hormone levels which reach peak at 1 to 2 hours after dosing. The mean half-life is approximately 1.5 hours. The absolute bioavailability of 100 micrograms of Preotact after subcutaneous administration in the abdomen is 55%.

=== Distribution ===
The volume of distribution at steady-state following intravenous administration is approximately 5.4 liters. Intersubject variability is about 40%.

=== Biotransformation ===
Parathyroid hormone is efficiently removed from the blood by a receptor-mediated process in the liver and is broken down into smaller peptide fragments. The fragments derived from the amino-terminus are further degraded within the cell while the fragments derived from the carboxy-terminus are released back into the blood and cleared by the kidney. These carboxy-terminal fragments are thought to play a role in the regulation of parathyroid hormone activity. Under normal physiological conditions full-length parathyroid hormone H constitutes only 5-30% of the circulating forms of the molecule, while 70-95% is present as carboxy-terminal fragments. Following administration of Preotact, carboxy-terminal fragments make up about 60-90% of the circulating forms of the molecule. Intersubject variability in systemic clearance is about 15%.

=== Elimination ===
Parathyroid hormone is metabolised in the liver and to a lesser extent in the kidney. It is not excreted from the body in its intact form. Circulating carboxy-terminal fragments are filtered by the kidney, but are subsequently broken down into even smaller fragments during tubular reuptake. No studies have so far been performed in patients with severe hepatic impairment. The pharmacokinetics of parathyroid hormone in patients with severe chronic kidney disease (creatinine clearance of less than 30 ml/min) has not been investigated either.

== Pharmaceutical particulars ==
Preotact drug cartridge

Preotact is delivered in a two chamber, glass ampoule. One chamber contains the active substance in the form of a white powder (with excipients: mannitol, citric acid monohydrate, NaCl, NaOH, HCl). And the other contains the solvent; water for injection. The powder is mixed with the solvent when the ampoule is inserted into the injection device.

== See also ==
- Teriparatide, another parathyroid hormone
