= Pseudopseudohypoparathyroidism =

Rare genetic disorder in the human body

- Specialty: Rheumatology, medical genetics, endocrinology
- Usual onset: Before birth
- Duration: Lifetime
- Differential diagnosis: Pseudohypoparathyroidism, hypoparathyroidism, Albright's hereditary osteodystrophy
- Treatment: Treatments to reduce symptoms, genetic counseling

Pseudopseudohypoparathyroidism (PPHP) /ˌsuː.doʊˌsuː.doʊˌhaɪ.poʊˌpær.əˌˈθaɪ.rɔɪ.dɪ.zəm/ is an inherited disorder, named for its similarity to pseudohypoparathyroidism in presentation. It is more properly Albright hereditary osteodystrophy, although without resistance of parathyroid hormone (PTH), as frequently seen in that affliction. The term is used to describe a condition where the individual has the phenotypic appearance of pseudohypoparathyroidism type 1a, but has (unexpected for the phenotype) normal labs, including calcium and PTH.

It can be considered a variant of Albright hereditary osteodystrophy (pseudohypoparathyroidism type 1A), as they present with the same constellation of signs and symptoms, including short stature, brachydactyly, subcutaneous calcification, and obesity.

Pseudopseudohypoparathyroidism holds the record for the longest non-contrived word in a major dictionary.

+3 is: Pseudopodpseudohypoparathyroidism

+9 is: Pseudopodpseudohypoparathyroidicolorism (Pseudopodpseudohypoparathyroidicolourism)

== Presentation ==
Pseudopseudohypoparathyroidism can be best understood by comparing it to other conditions:

Condition		Appearance	PTH levels	Calcitriol	Calcium	Phosphates	Imprinting
Hypoparathyroidism		Normal	Low	Low	Low	High	Not applicable
Pseudohypoparathyroidism	Type 1A	Skeletal defects	High	Low	Low	High	Gene defect from mother (GNAS1)
Pseudohypoparathyroidism	Type 1B	Normal	High	Low	Low	High	Gene defect from mother (GNAS1 and STX16)
Pseudohypoparathyroidism	Type 2	Normal	High	Low	Low	High	?
Pseudopseudohypoparathyroidism		Skeletal defects	Normal	Normal	Normal	Normal	Gene defect from father

Hormone resistance is not present in pseudopseudohypoparathyroidism. Short stature may be present. Obesity is less common in pseudopseudohypoparathyroidism than in pseudohypoparathyroidism. Osteoma cutis may be present.

== Genetics ==
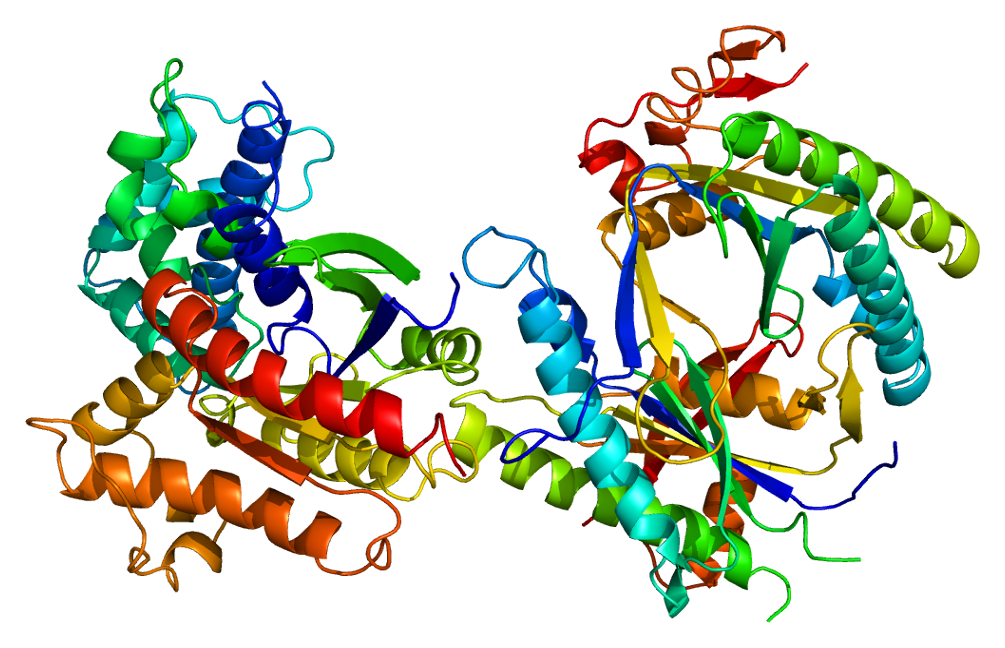
Protein GNAS

A male with pseudohypoparathyroidism has a 50% chance of passing on the defective GNAS gene to his children, although in an imprinted, inactive form. Any of his children receiving this gene will have pseudopseudohypoparathyroidism. Any of his daughters that have pseudopseudohypoparathyroidism may in turn pass along pseudohypoparathyroidism 1A to her children, as the imprinting pattern on the inherited paternal gene will be changed to the maternal pattern in the mother's ovum during meiosis. The gene will be reactivated in any children who inherit it.

Pseudopseudohypoparathyroidism and pseudohypoparathyroidism both involve the same GNAS gene, but pseudopseudohypoparathyroidism has normal calcium homeostasis because of the normal maternal allele in the kidney.

== Pathophysiology ==
The GNAS1 gene involved in both pseudohypoparathyroidism type 1a and pseudopseudohypoparathyroidism is greatly affected by imprinting. When a father who has pseudohypoparathyroidism undergoes spermatogenesis, imprinting of the GNAS1 gene inactivates both copies of his genes: one will be functional, and the other will be defective. Tissues in the body will re-activate different copies of the GNAS1 gene selectively; the kidneys will selectively activate the (functional) maternal copy while keeping the (defective) paternally-derived gene imprinted and inactive, even in normal individuals. Since the maternally-derived GNAS1 gene is functional, renal handling of calcium and phosphate is normal, and homeostasis is maintained in pseudopseudohypoparathyroidism. However, the rest of the tissues will instead selectively display the defective gene, resulting in haploinsufficiency of the GNAS1 product in most tissues, and giving the phenotype of pseudohypoparathyroidism type 1a. As a result, there is also a normal response of urinary cAMP to PTH, and normal serum PTH.

== Diagnosis ==
The diagnosis is based on the presence of the Albright hereditary osteodystrophy phenotype but without the PTH resistance. Blood tests including calcium, phosphate, and PTH will exclude other forms of pseudohypoparathyroidism. X-rays may reveal a short fourth metacarpal. Genetic testing can confirm the diagnosis by showing GNAS gene mutation.

== Treatment ==
Treatments focuses on symptoms, with genetic counseling recommended.

== History ==
It was characterized in 1952 by Fuller Albright as "pseudo-pseudohypoparathyroidism" (with hyphen).

== See also ==
- GNAS complex locus
- Parathyroid hormone
- Longest word in English
