= Archibald's sign =

- Differential diagnosis: Turners syndrome

Archibald's sign (also known as Archibald's metacarpal sign) refers to a feature in the hand characterized by a shortening of the fourth or/and fifth metacarpals when the fist is clenched.

== Causes ==
The causes of Archibald's sign are not known; however, it has been discovered that it occurs more often in populations with certain disorders. Archibald's sign appears to be more common in individuals who have Turners syndrome. It also seems to be more commonly found in pseudohypoparathyroidism of Albright's hereditary osteodystrophy, brachydactyly, acrodysostosis, and occasionally with homocystinuria.

== See also ==
- Pseudohypoparathyroidism
