= GNAS complex locus =

Gene locus

GNAS
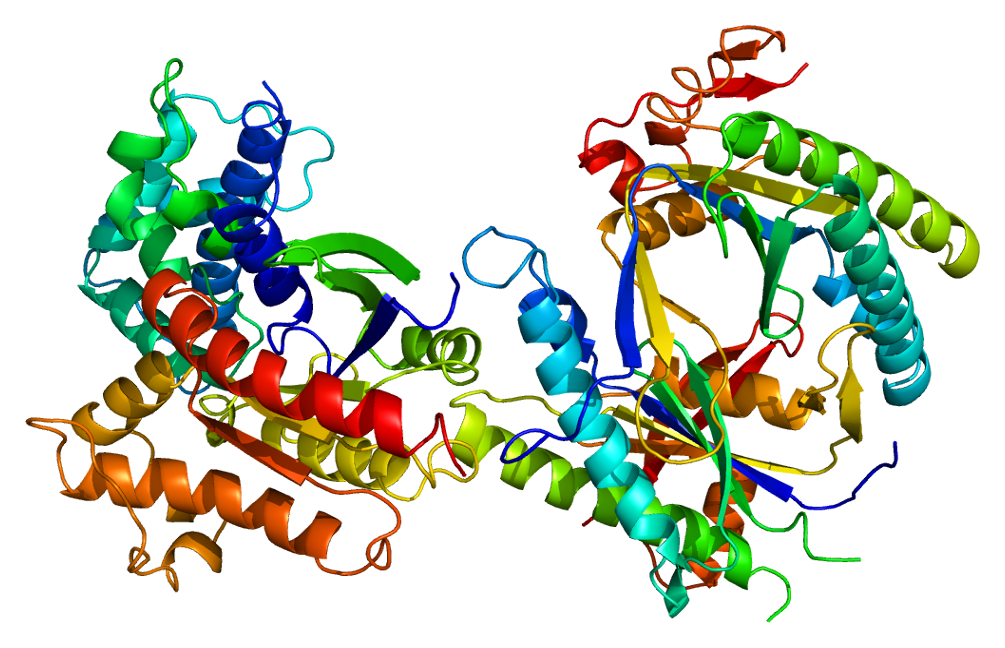

Identifiers
- Aliases: GNAS, AHO, C20orf45, GNAS1, GPSA, GSA, GSP, NESP, POH, SCG6, SgVI, GNAS complex locus, PITA3
- External IDs: OMIM: 139320; MGI: 95777; GeneCards: GNAS

Gene location (Human)
Chr.	Chromosome 20 (human)
Band	20q13.32	Start	58,839,718 bp
Band	20q13.32	End	58,911,192 bp

Gene location (Mouse)
Chr.	Chromosome 2 (mouse)
Band	2 H4|2 97.89 cM	Start	174,126,113 bp
Band	2 H4|2 97.89 cM	End	174,188,537 bp
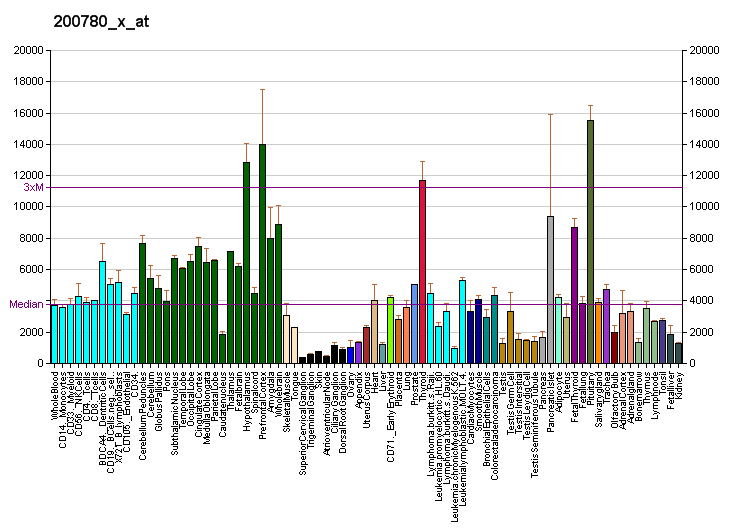

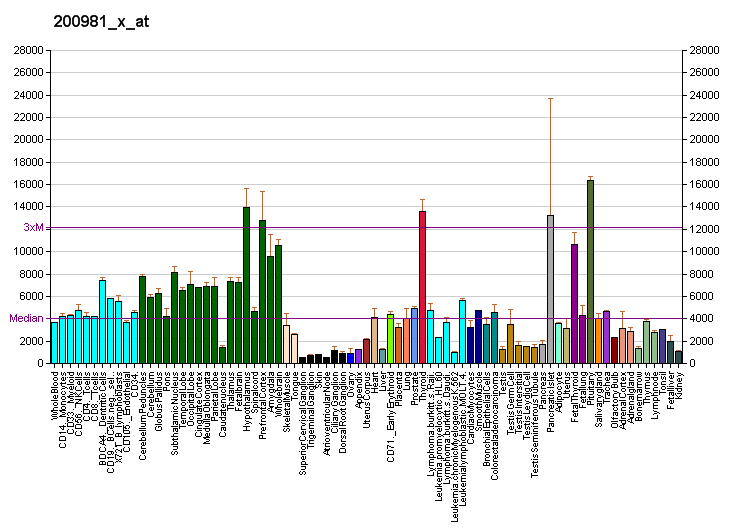

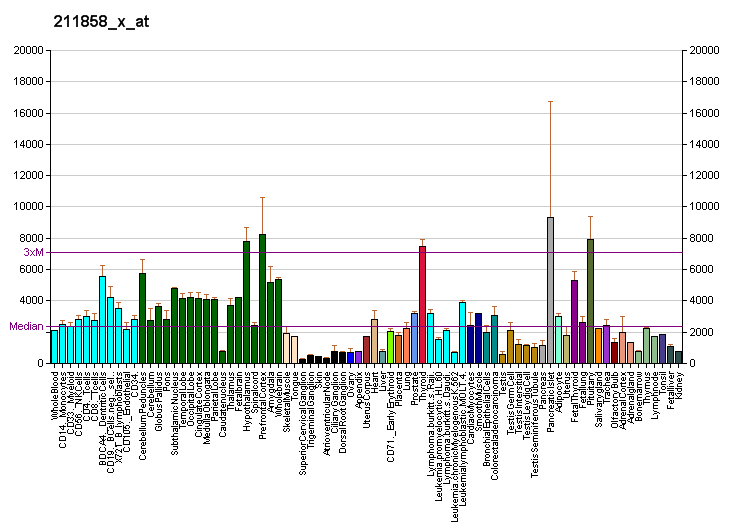
RNA expression pattern
Bgee	Human / Mouse (ortholog); Top expressed in: beta cell; postcentral gyrus; Brodmann area 46; pituitary gland; lateral nuclear group of thalamus; anterior pituitary; Brodmann area 10; entorhinal cortex; superior frontal gyrus; frontal pole / Top expressed in: superior cervical ganglion; entorhinal cortex; dorsomedial hypothalamic nucleus; perirhinal cortex; pituitary gland; CA3 field; human fetus; central gray substance of midbrain; median eminence; dermis; More reference expression data
BioGPS	More reference expression data
Gene ontology
Molecular function	molecular function; nucleotide binding; G-protein beta/gamma-subunit complex binding; GTP binding; signal transducer activity; metal ion binding; protein binding; GTPase activity; guanyl nucleotide binding; adenylate cyclase activator activity; insulin-like growth factor receptor binding; mu-type opioid receptor binding; corticotropin-releasing hormone receptor 1 binding; beta-2 adrenergic receptor binding; ionotropic glutamate receptor binding; D1 dopamine receptor binding; G protein-coupled receptor binding
Cellular component	cytoplasm; perinuclear region of cytoplasm; extracellular region; transport vesicle; cytoplasmic vesicle; nucleus; cytosol; trans-Golgi network membrane; membrane; plasma membrane; heterotrimeric G-protein complex; intrinsic component of membrane; extracellular exosome; ruffle; cell projection; dendrite; apical plasma membrane
Biological process	female pregnancy; negative regulation of multicellular organism growth; response to parathyroid hormone; protein secretion; positive regulation of cold-induced thermogenesis; hair follicle placode formation; cellular response to catecholamine stimulus; adenylate cyclase-activating dopamine receptor signaling pathway; adenylate cyclase-activating G protein-coupled receptor signaling pathway; cognition; regulation of insulin secretion; cellular response to glucagon stimulus; intracellular transport; positive regulation of cAMP-mediated signaling; activation of adenylate cyclase activity; cellular response to prostaglandin E stimulus; adenylate cyclase-activating adrenergic receptor signaling pathway; sensory perception of smell; positive regulation of GTPase activity; developmental growth; renal water homeostasis; bone development; platelet aggregation; signal transduction; G protein-coupled receptor signaling pathway; regulation of signal transduction; skeletal system development; genomic imprinting; multicellular organism growth; positive regulation of osteoclast differentiation; endochondral ossification; regulation of parathyroid hormone secretion; post-embryonic development; post-embryonic body morphogenesis; DNA methylation; cartilage development; positive regulation of osteoblast differentiation; tissue homeostasis; sensory perception of chemical stimulus; embryonic cranial skeleton morphogenesis; energy reserve metabolic process; skin development; embryonic hindlimb morphogenesis; adenylate cyclase-modulating G protein-coupled receptor signaling pathway; positive regulation of catalytic activity
Sources:Amigo / QuickGO
Orthologs
Databases	NCBI: entry; OMA: entry
Species	Human	Mouse
Entrez	2778	14683
Ensembl	ENSG00000087460	ENSMUSG00000027523
UniProt	O95467; P63092; P84996; Q5JWF2	P63094; Q6R0H7; Q9Z0F1; Q6R0H6
RefSeq (mRNA)	NM_000516; NM_001077488; NM_001077489; NM_001077490; NM_001309840 NM_001309842; NM_001309861; NM_001309883; NM_016592; NM_080425; NM_080426	NM_001077507; NM_001077510; NM_010309; NM_010310; NM_019690 NM_022000; NM_201616; NM_201617; NM_201618; NM_001310083; NM_001310085; NM_001364030
RefSeq (protein)	NP_000507; NP_001070956; NP_001070957; NP_001070958; NP_001296769 NP_001296771; NP_001296790; NP_001296812; NP_057676; NP_536350; NP_536351; NP_000507.1; NP_001070956.1; NP_001070957.1; NP_001070958.1; NP_001296769.1; NP_536350.2; NP_536351.1; NP_001070958.1; NP_001296812.1; NP_001296812.1; NP_536350.2	NP_001070975; NP_001070978; NP_001297012; NP_001297014; NP_034439 NP_062664; NP_068840; NP_963910; NP_963911; NP_963912; NP_001350959; NP_001070975.1; NP_001297014.1; NP_034439.2; NP_963911.1; NP_062664.2; NP_068840.2; NP_001070975.1; NP_001297014.1; NP_963911.1; NP_963912.1
Location (UCSC)	Chr 20: 58.84 – 58.91 Mb	Chr 2: 174.13 – 174.19 Mb
PubMed search
- Wikidata
View/Edit Human	View/Edit Mouse

GNAS complex locus is a gene locus in humans. Its main product is the heterotrimeric G-protein alpha subunit G_{s}-α, a key component of G protein-coupled receptor-regulated adenylyl cyclase signal transduction pathways. GNAS stands for Guanine Nucleotide binding protein, Alpha Stimulating activity polypeptide.

== Gene ==
This gene locus has a highly complex imprinted expression pattern. It gives rise to maternally-, paternally- and biallelically-expressed transcripts that are derived from four alternative promoters with distinct 5' exons. Some transcripts contain a differentially methylated region (DMR) within their 5' exons; such DMRs are commonly found in imprinted genes and correlate with transcript expression. An antisense transcript also exists, and this antisense transcript and one of the sense transcripts are paternally expressed, produce non-coding RNAs and may regulate imprinting in this region. In addition, one of the transcripts contains a second frame-shifted open reading frame, which encodes a structurally unrelated protein named ALEX.

== Products and functions ==
The GNAS locus is imprinted and encodes 5 main transcripts:

- G_{s}-α (G_{s}-α long, P63092-1), biallelic
- A/B transcript (G_{s}-α short, P63092-2), biallelic: contains an alternate 5' terminal exon (A/B or Exon 1A) and uses a downstream start codon to have a shortened amino terminal region.
  - STX16 deletion causes loss of methylation at the A/B exon, leading to PHP1B.
- XLαs (Extra long alpha-s, Q5JWF2), paternal
  - ALEX (Alternative gene product encoded by XL-exon, P84996), may inhibit XLαs
- NESP55 (Neuroendocrine secretory protein 55, O95467), maternal
- antisense GNAS transcript (Nespas: neuroendocrine secretory protein antisense)
  - Binds to the PRC2 complex. Abolition of expression causes abnormal methylation and imprinting loss.

Alternative splicing of downstream exons is also observed, which results in different forms of the G_{s}-α, a key element of the classical signal transduction pathway linking receptor-ligand interactions with the activation of adenylyl cyclase and a variety of cellular responses. Multiple transcript variants have been found for this gene, but the full-length nature and/or biological validity of some variants have not been determined.

Three of the GNAS gene products, G_{s}α-long, G_{s}α-short, and XLαs, are different forms of G_{s}α, and differ mainly in the N-terminal region. Traditional G protein-coupled receptor signaling proceeds primarily through G_{s}α-long and G_{s}α-short, the most abundant, ubiquitously-expressed protein products of this gene. XLαs is the "extra large" isoform, and has a very long N-terminal region with some internal repeats not well-conserved across species. The XL exon also encodes in another reading frame the protein product ALEX, an inhibitory cofactor binding to the unique domain. The structure for GNAS is solved for the canonical P63092-1 isoform only, and little is known about what the special region of XLas or ALEX looks like.

NESP55 is a protein product completely unrelated to the GNAS protein. It undergoes extensive posttranslation processing, and is sometimes grouped as a granin. Nearly nothing is known about its structure; protein structure prediction predicts a mostly disordered protein with an N-terminal globular domain made up of alpha-helices.

== Clinical significance ==
Mutations in GNAS products are associated with:

- Albright hereditary osteodystrophy
- pseudohypoparathyroidism type Ia and Ib
- pseudopseudohypoparathyroidism
- McCune–Albright syndrome
- Myxoma

Mutations in this gene also result in progressive osseous heteroplasia, polyostotic fibrous dysplasia of bone, and some pituitary tumors. Mutations in the repeat region of the XL exon leads to a hyperactive form of XLas due to lowered interaction with ALEX. As XLas is expressed in platelets, the risk of bleeding is elevated.

Many alleles in mice have been constructed for analyzing disease associations. Mice with this gene half knocked-out and half-mutated (tm1Jop/Oedsml) display increased heart weight, increased startle reflex, and abnormalities in bone structure and mineralization; some other alternations can be lethal. Metabolic problems resembling pseudohypoparathyroidism are seen in heterozygous mutated (wt/Oedsml) mice. Knocking out the antisense transcript is known to, at minimum, cause methylation defects.

== Interactions ==
G protein-coupled receptor-activated G_{s}α binds to the enzyme adenylyl cyclase, increasing its rate of conversion of ATP to cyclic AMP.

G_{s}α has been shown to interact with RIC8A.
