= St. Vincent's Institute of Medical Research =

Australian medical research institute

Coordinates: 37.80668°S 144.97396°E

St Vincent's Institute of Medical Research
- Founder: Sisters of Charity
- Established: 1951; 75 years ago
- Chair: Michael Burn
- Director: Fabienne Mackay
- Faculty: University of Melbourne
- Adjunct faculty: St Vincent's Hospital
- Budget: A$48 million (2025)
- Formerly called: St Vincent’s School of Medical Research
- Location: 9 Princes Street, Fitzroy, Melbourne, Victoria, Australia
- Website: www.svi.edu.au

St Vincent's Institute of Medical Research (SVI) is an independent Australian medical research institute located in Fitzroy, Melbourne, Victoria. The Institute conducts medical research into the cause, prevention and treatment of diseases that are common and have serious effects on health. These include type 1 diabetes, obesity, heart disease and type 2 diabetes, arthritis and osteoporosis, cancer and the spread of cancer, infectious diseases such as hepatitis and AIDS and Alzheimer's disease and other neurological disorders.

SVI has been directed by Professor Fabienne Mackay since August 2026 who took over from Professor Tom Kay who stepped down after 24 years in the role.

Founded in 1951 by the Sisters of Charity, SVI is affiliated with The University of Melbourne and St Vincent's Hospital, and is a member institution of the Mary Aikenhead Ministries.

== See also ==
- Health in Australia
- Thomas Martin (pathologist)
