= Thomas Martin (pathologist) =

Australian pathologist (born 1937)

Thomas John Martin AO FRACP FRCPA FAA FRS
- Born: Thomas John "Jack" Martin; January 24, 1937 (age 88)
- Education: University of Melbourne; Degrees: Bachelor of Medicine (MB) (1960); Bachelor of Surgery (BS) (1960); Doctor of Medicine (MD) (1969); Doctor of Science (DSc) (1979)
- Alma mater: University of Melbourne
- Known for: Discovery of parathyroid hormone-related protein (PTHrP)
- Scientific career
- Fields: Pathology; Medicine; Cell biology; Osteology; Endocrinology
- Institutions: University of Sheffield (1960); Saint Vincent's Institute (1961–1963); Royal Melbourne Hospital (1964, 1967–1968); Royal Australasian College of Physicians (1964–1969); Royal Postgraduate Medical School (1965-1966); Austin Hospital, Heidelberg (1969–1974); University of Sheffield (1974–1977)

Thomas John "Jack" Martin is an Australian pathologist, emeritus professor of medicine, physician and academic at University of Melbourne, and researcher who, in 1987, by leading a former team of researchers at the same university, discovered a proteinaceous hormone called parathyroid hormone-related protein (PTHrP). In September 2005, further research was conducted by the team of Dengshun Miao and David Goltzman at the Calcium Research Laboratory and Department of Medicine, Royal Victoria Hospital of the McGill University Health Centre, and others.

Martin is a member of Natalie A. Sims' laboratory at Saint Vincent's Institute of Medical Research. He works in the institute's Division of Medicine, Dentistry and Health Sciences, and his primary interest is cell biology of bones.

== Research career ==
Martin was the director of St Vincent's Institute from 1988 to 2002. In September 2005, Martin found that PTHrP produced by osteoblasts is a physiological regulator of bone formation.

In July 2022, Martin and his team at Natalie A. Sims' lab, after much research on mice, found that deletion of the gene that codes for a receptor protein called granulocyte colony-stimulating factor receptor (G-CSF) increases physiological dysfunction of cortical bones of mice having hyperactivated STAT3 proteins in their bone cells. Cortical bone maturation depends on SOCS3-mediated suppression of interleukin-6 cytokine-induced STAT3 phosphorylation in bone cells, which form the cellular network embedded in bone matrix. They concluded that G-CSFR signaling could indirectly limit bone resorption and angiogenesis, and thereby has a major role in replacing condensed trabecular bone with lamellar bone during cortical bone formation.

== Awards and honours ==
Year	Award
1969	Fellow of the Royal Australasian College of Physicians (FRACP)
1971	Selwyn Smith Prize for medical research
1974	Eric Susman Prize received from the Royal Australasian College of Physicians
1990	Lemberg Medal received from the Australian Biochemical Society
1992	Honorary Doctor of Medicine (MD(Hon)) received from the University of Sheffield; Dale Medal received from the British Society for Endocrinology

- In August 2022, an award "TJ Martin Medal" was named in Martin's honour. The medal was awarded to gastroenterologist Chamara Basnayake at St Vincent's Hospital for his research into the multidisciplinary treatment of functional gastrointestinal disorders.
