= Parathyroid hormone family =

Identifiers
- Symbol: Parathyroid
- Pfam: PF01279
- InterPro: IPR001415
- PROSITE: PDOC00296
- SCOP2: 1zwg / SCOPe / SUPFAM
Available protein structures:
- PDB: IPR001415 PF01279 (ECOD; PDBsum)
- AlphaFold: IPR001415; PF01279

The parathyroid hormone family is a family of structurally and functionally related proteins. Parathyroid hormone (PTH) is a polypeptidic hormone primarily involved in calcium metabolism. The parathyroid hormone-related protein (PTH-rP) is a related protein with predominantly paracrine function and possibly an endocrine role in lactation, as PTHrP has been found to be secreted by mammary glands into the circulation and increase bone turnover. PTH and PTH-rP bind to the same G-protein coupled receptor. The related protein PTH-L has been found in teleost fish, which also have two forms of PTH and PTHrP. Three subfamilies can be identified: PTH, PTHrP and PTH-L.

== Human proteins containing this domain ==
- PTH
- PTHLH
