= Chondrodysplasia Blomstrand =

- Other names: Blomstrand's lethal chondrodysplasia
- This condition is inherited in an autosomal recessive manner.

Chondrodysplasia Blomstrand is a rare genetic disorder characterized by a mutation of the parathyroid hormone receptor, leading to the absence of a functional PTHR1. This condition causes abnormal ossification of the endocrine system and intermembranous tissues, along with accelerated skeletal maturation.
