= Pseudohypoparathyroidism =

Rare genetic condition

- Specialty: Endocrinology

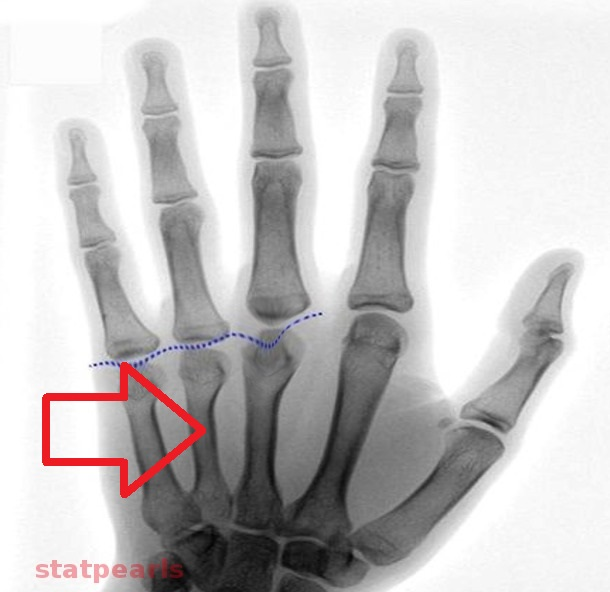
Short metacarpals as may be seen in pseudohypoparathyroidism type 1a and 1c

Pseudohypoparathyroidism is a rare autosomal dominant genetic condition associated primarily with resistance to the parathyroid hormone. Those with the condition have a low serum calcium and high phosphate, but the parathyroid hormone level (PTH) is inappropriately high (due to the low level of calcium in the blood). Its pathogenesis has been linked to dysfunctional G proteins (in particular, Gs alpha subunit). Pseudohypoparathyroidism is a very rare disorder, with estimated prevalence between 0.3 and 1.1 cases per 100,000 population depending on geographic location.

== Types ==
Types include:

Type 1a (OMIM 103580)
Has a characteristic phenotypic appearance (Albright's hereditary osteodystrophy), including short fourth and fifth metacarpals and a rounded facies. It is most likely an autosomal dominant disorder. It is also associated with thyroid stimulating hormone resistance. Caused by GNAS1 mutation.
Type 1b (OMIM 603233)
Lacks the physical appearance of type 1a, but is biochemically similar. It is associated with a methylation defect in the A/B exon of GNAS1, caused by STX16 disruption.
Type 2 (OMIM 203330)
Also lacks the physical appearance of type 1a. Since the genetic defect in type 2 is further down the signalling pathway than in type 1, there is a normal cAMP response to PTH stimulation despite the inherent abnormality in calcium regulation. The specific gene is not identified.

While biochemically similar, type 1 and 2 disease may be distinguished by the differing urinary excretion of cyclic AMP in response to exogenous PTH.

Some sources also refer to a "type 1c" (OMIM 612462). The phenotype is the same as in type 1a, but red blood cells show normal Gs activity. As it is also caused by a GNAS mutation, it is not clear whether it should be considered an entity separate from Ia.

== Presentation ==
Patients may present with features of hypocalcaemia including carpo-pedal muscular spasms, cramping, tetany, and if the calcium deficit is severe, generalized seizures. IQ is typically mildly depressed or unaffected. Additional characteristics include short stature, obesity, developmental delay, and calcification of the basal ganglia in the deep white matter of the brain.

Type 1a pseudohypoparathyroidism is clinically manifest by bone resorption with blunting of the fourth and fifth knuckles of the hand, most notable when the dorsum of the hand is viewed in closed fist position. This presentation is known as 'knuckle knuckle dimple dimple' sign (Archibald's sign). This is as opposed to Turner syndrome which is characterized by blunting of only the fourth knuckle, and Down syndrome, which is associated with a hypoplastic middle phalanx.

=== Related conditions ===
The term pseudopseudohypoparathyroidism is used to describe a condition where the individual has the phenotypic appearance of pseudohypoparathyroidism type 1a, but is biochemically normal.

Condition		Appearance	PTH levels	Calcitriol	Calcium	Phosphates	Imprinting
Hypoparathyroidism		Normal	Low	Low	Low	High	Not applicable
Pseudohypoparathyroidism	Type 1A	Skeletal defects	High	Low	Low	High	Gene defect from mother (GNAS1)
Pseudohypoparathyroidism	Type 1B	Normal	High	Low	Low	High	Likely a gene defect from mother (GNAS1 and STX16) however it can also be the result of an imprinting issue of (GNAS1) due to mother and father in equal measure
Pseudohypoparathyroidism	Type 2	Normal	High	Low	Low	High	?
Pseudopseudohypoparathyroidism		Skeletal defects	Normal	Normal	Normal	Normal	gene defect from father

== Diagnosis ==
=== Biochemical findings ===
- hypocalcemia
- hyperphosphatemia
- elevated parathyroid hormone (hyperparathyroidism)
- Suppressed calcitriol levels

== Treatment ==
Calcium and Calcitriol supplements, the latter with a larger dose than for treatment of hypoparathyroidism.

== See also ==
- Hypoparathyroidism
- Pseudopseudohypoparathyroidism
- Hyperparathyroidism
- Rickets
- Hypervitaminosis D
