= Parathyroid hormone receptor =

parathyroid hormone 1 receptor

Identifiers
- Symbol: PTH1R
- Alt. symbols: PTHR, PFE
- NCBI gene: 5745
- HGNC: 9608
- OMIM: 168468
- RefSeq: NM_000316
- UniProt: Q03431

Other data
- Locus: Chr. 3 p22-p21.1
Search for
- Structures: Swiss-model
- Domains: InterPro

parathyroid hormone 2 receptor

Identifiers
- Symbol: PTH2R
- NCBI gene: 5746
- HGNC: 9609
- OMIM: 601469
- RefSeq: NM_005048
- UniProt: P49190

Other data
- Locus: Chr. 2 q33
Search for
- Structures: Swiss-model
- Domains: InterPro

There are two known parathyroid hormone receptors in mammals termed PTH1R and PTH2R. These receptors bind parathyroid hormone and are members of the GPCR family of transmembrane proteins.

- parathyroid hormone 1 receptor (PTH1R) is the classical PTH receptor, is expressed in high levels in bone and kidney and regulates calcium ion homeostasis through activation of adenylate cyclase and phospholipase C.
- parathyroid hormone 2 receptor (PTH2R) is expressed primarily in the central nervous system, pancreas, testis, and placenta.
