= Iron metabolism disorder =

- Structure of Heme b; "Fe" is the chemical symbol of iron, "II" indicates its oxidation state.
- Specialty: Medical genetics

Iron metabolism disorders may involve a number of genes including HFE and TFR2.

Hepcidin is the master regulator of iron metabolism and, therefore, most genetic forms of iron overload can be thought of as relative hepcidin deficiency in one way or another. For instance, a severe form of iron overload, juvenile hemochromatosis, is a result of severe hepcidin deficiency. The majority of cases are caused by mutations in the hemojuvelin gene (HJV or RGMc/repulsive guidance molecule c). The exceptions, people who have mutations in the gene for ferroportin, prove the rule: these people have plenty of hepcidin, but their cells lack the proper response to it. So, in people with ferroportin proteins that transport iron out of cells without responding to hepcidin's signals to stop, they have a deficiency in the action of hepcidin, if not in hepcidin itself.

But the exact mechanisms of most of the various forms of adult hemochromatosis, which make up most of the genetic iron overload disorders, remain unsolved. So while researchers have been able to identify genetic mutations causing several adult variants of hemochromatosis, they now must turn their attention to the normal function of these mutated genes.

These genes represent multiple steps along the pathway of iron regulation, from the body's ability to sense iron, to the body's ability to regulate uptake and storage. Working out the functions of each gene in this pathway will be an important tool for finding new methods of treating genetic disorders, as well as for understanding the basic workings of the pathway.

== See also ==
- Human iron metabolism
- Iron deficiency anemia
