= STX16 =

Protein-coding gene in the species Homo sapiens

Identifiers
- Aliases: STX16, SYN16, syntaxin 16, SYN-16
- External IDs: OMIM: 603666; MGI: 1923396; GeneCards: STX16

Gene location (Human)
Chr.	Chromosome 20 (human)
Band	20q13.32	Start	58,651,253 bp
Band	20q13.32	End	58,679,526 bp

Gene location (Mouse)
Chr.	Chromosome 2 (mouse)
Band	2|2 H4	Start	173,918,101 bp
Band	2|2 H4	End	173,941,564 bp
RNA expression pattern
Bgee	Human / Mouse (ortholog); Top expressed in: right uterine tube; sural nerve; corpus callosum; superficial temporal artery; pituitary gland; right hemisphere of cerebellum; body of uterus; C1 segment; right ovary; anterior pituitary / Top expressed in: hand; neural layer of retina; otolith organ; utricle; thymus; lens; cerebellar cortex; primary visual cortex; yolk sac; superior frontal gyrus; More reference expression data
BioGPS	n/a
Gene ontology
Molecular function	SNAP receptor activity; protein binding; syntaxin binding; SNARE binding
Cellular component	cytoplasm; integral component of membrane; Golgi apparatus; membrane; intracellular membrane-bounded organelle; Golgi cisterna; focal adhesion; trans-Golgi network; SNARE complex; endoplasmic reticulum; perinuclear region of cytoplasm; cytosol; trans-Golgi network membrane; Golgi membrane; endomembrane system; integral component of synaptic vesicle membrane
Biological process	vesicle docking; retrograde transport, endosome to Golgi; protein transport; intracellular protein transport; vesicle fusion; Golgi ribbon formation; vesicle-mediated transport; transport
Sources:Amigo / QuickGO
Orthologs
Databases	NCBI: entry; OMA: entry
Species	Human	Mouse
Entrez	8675	228960
Ensembl	ENSG00000124222	ENSMUSG00000027522
UniProt	O14662	Q8BVI5
RefSeq (mRNA)	NM_001001433; NM_001001434; NM_001134772; NM_001134773; NM_001204868 NM_003763	NM_001102423; NM_001102424; NM_001102425; NM_172675; NM_001363029 NM_001363030; NM_001363031
RefSeq (protein)	NP_001001433; NP_001128244; NP_001128245; NP_001191797; NP_003754	NP_001095893; NP_001095894; NP_001095895; NP_766263; NP_001349958 NP_001349959; NP_001349960
Location (UCSC)	Chr 20: 58.65 – 58.68 Mb	Chr 2: 173.92 – 173.94 Mb
PubMed search
- Wikidata
View/Edit Human	View/Edit Mouse

Syntaxin-16 (STX16) is a part of a protein family group called SNARE proteins (soluble N-ethylmaleimide-sensitive factor attachment proteins). SNARE proteins can generally be classified into two types: v-SNAREs(vesicle-SNAREs), which are embedded in the membranes of transport vesicles as they form, and t-SNAREs (target-SNAREs), which are located on the target membranes, such as those found at nerve terminals. STX16 is considered to be a t-SNARE, making it a key protein that makes membrane fusion happen.

== Gene ==
=== Homo Sapiens (Humans) ===
Syntaxin-16 is a protein that in humans encoded by the STX16 gene., it found in Chromosome-20 (Chr 20: 58.65 – 58.68 Mb). It's composed of 325 amino acids. The STX16 gene can be expressed in many different isoforms; It has 23 different splice variants. It also has a lot of evolutionary relatives, including 197 orthologs across species, indicating strong evolutionary conservation. Additionally, it has 12 paralogs within the same genome, and it is related to 2 different phenotypes.

=== Mus musculus (Mice) ===
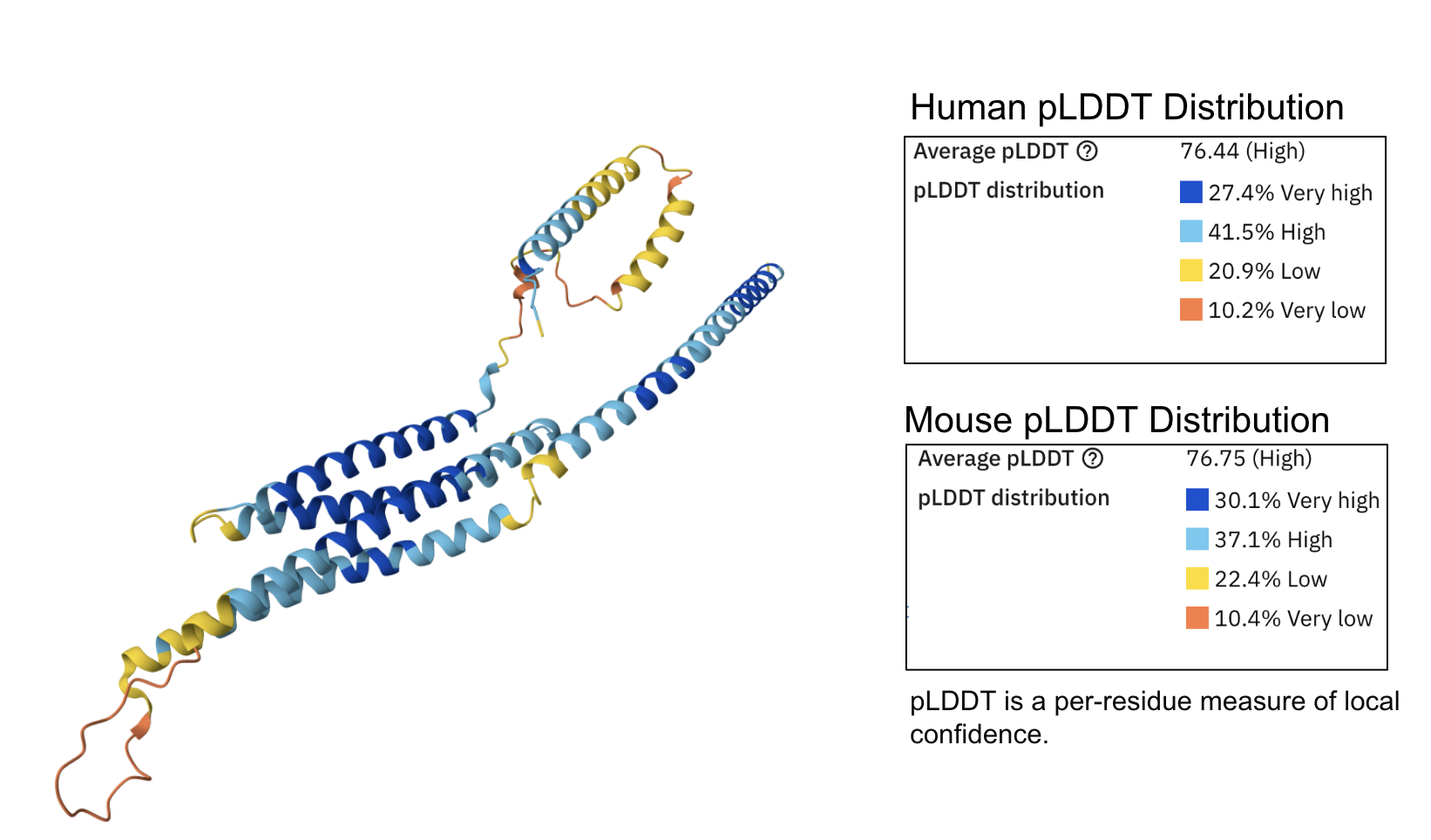
Predicted structure for STX16. Made by AlphaFold, using sequences provided from UniProt to make the predicted structure.

STX16 is found in Chromosome 2 (Chr 2: 173.92 – 173.94 Mb)and encodes a protein that is 326 amino acids long. The STX16 gene can be expressed in many different isoforms; it has 5 different splice variants. It also has many related versions in other species, 197 orthologs across species, indicating strong evolutionary conservation. Additionally, it has 12 paralogs within the genome, and it is related to 29 different phenotypes.

== Associations ==
Homo Sapiens (Humans)

1.It has been associated with pseudohypoparathyroidism type 1B. Losing this gene causes loss of methylation at GNAS1 exon A/B.

Studies have shown that deletions affecting STX16 (syntaxin-16) are linked to Pseudohypoparathyroidism type Ib (PHP-1B). In particular, a “microdeletion” in the STX16 region, either a ~3-kilobase or a novel ~4.4-kilobase deletion which are found in many families with the autosomal dominant form of PHP-1B. People inheriting the deletion from their mother show a loss of DNA methylation specifically at GNAS (guanine nucleotide-binding protein, alpha stimulating) exon A/B, while other differentially methylated regions of GNAS remain unaffected. The loss of this methylation imprint is believed to disrupt the normal regulation of GNAS, particularly by reducing expression of the G protein α-subunit (Gsα) in hormone-responsive tissues such as the kidney, which in turn leads to the PTH (parathyroid hormone) resistance characteristic of PHP-1B.

In short, the deletion of STX16 disrupts a putative “imprinting control element” needed for correct GNAS methylation, and loss of methylation at exon A/B is the molecular hallmark linking STX16 deletions to PHP-1B.

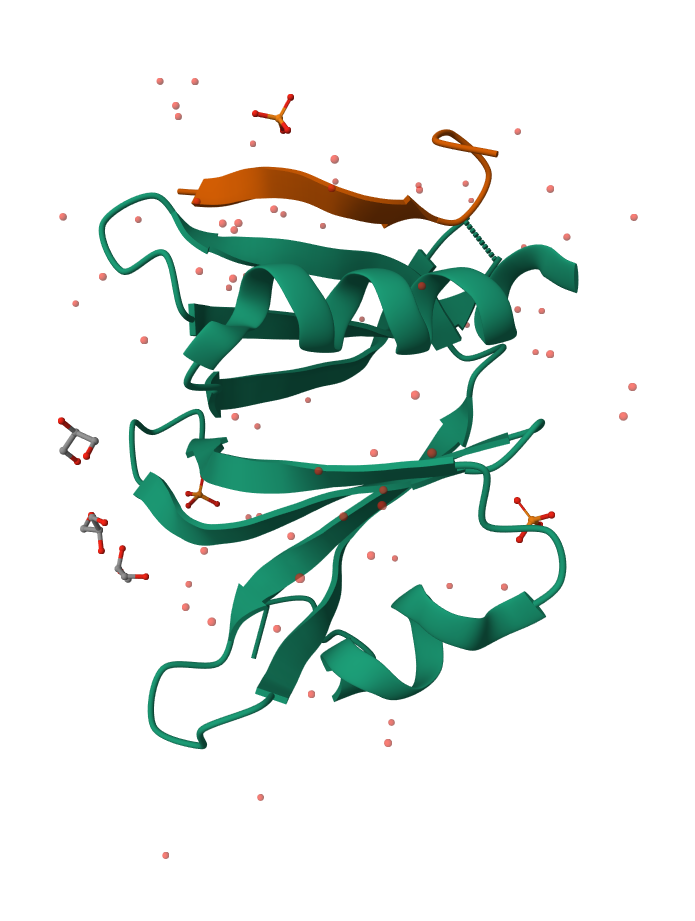
Human - X-ray of TBC1D23 PH domain complexed with STX16. The orange section being STX16 and the green being TBC1D23

2. STX16 has been shown to interact with TBC1D23.

Researchers were able to identify binding partners for the C-terminal “PH-Like” domain of TBC1D23 by using Affinity chromatography and Mass Spectrometry, by doing so they discovered that the cytoplasmic tail of STX16 is able to interact with TBC1D23. It was identified that fragments of STX16 ~151-225 amino acids are both necessary and sufficient for them to interact, establishing a direct binding between TBC1D23 and STX16.

To comprehend their binding, researchers created a 3D structure of the end of TBC1D23 bound to a small piece of STX16. They found that this short segment of STX16 fits tightly along the surface of TBC1D23, slotting two of its amino acids into small pockets and forming additional charge based interactions. This close fit explains why the two proteins are able to specifically recognize each other.

Overall this interconnection between proteins displayed an important role in how cells transport materials. When researchers modified the binding parts of with TBC1D23 or STX16, vesicles were no longer able to properly be captured and directed to the golgi. This outcome indicated that TBC1D23 is acting like a “tether,” that helps the golgi catch incoming vesicles by attaching to STX16 in order to secure cargo being delivered to and from the right place before membrane fusion occurs

Mus musculus (Mice)

This protein is thought to participate in multiple cellular processes, such as endosomal trafficking, vesicle docking, and vesicle fusion. It is localized to the Golgi apparatus and is expressed in a variety of tissues, including the central nervous system, connective tissue, the genitourinary system, the gut, and the immune system.

STX16 Molecular Functions

- Protein binding
- Syntaxin binding
- SNAP receptor activity
- SNARE binding

Cellular locations where the STX16 product is active

- Golgi membrane
- Golgi apparatus
- trans-Golgi network
- perinuclear region of cytoplasm
- focal adhesion
- cytoplasm
- intracellular membrane-bounded organelle
- SNARE complex
- cytosol
- endomembrane system
- synaptic vesicle membrane
- Golgi cisterna
- trans-Golgi network membrane
