= Albright's hereditary osteodystrophy =

Form of osteodystrophy and a rare human disease

- Albright's hereditary osteodystrophy has an autosomal dominant pattern of inheritance
- Specialty: Endocrinology
- Symptoms: Choroid plexus calcification, Full cheeks
- Causes: Gs alpha subunit deficiency
- Diagnostic method: calcium, phosphorus, PTH, Urine test for phosphorus and cyclic AMP
- Treatment: Phosphate binders, supplementary calcium
- Named after: Fuller Albright

Albright's hereditary osteodystrophy is a form of osteodystrophy, and is classified as the phenotype of pseudohypoparathyroidism type 1A; this is a condition in which the body does not respond to parathyroid hormone.

== Signs and symptoms ==
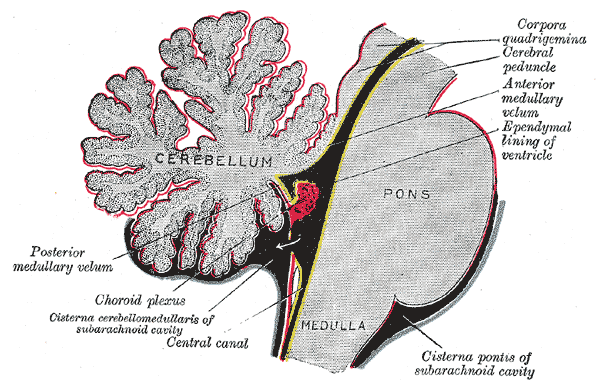
Choroid plexus(bottom left)

The disorder is characterized by the following:

- Hypogonadism
- Brachydactyly syndrome
- Choroid plexus calcification
- Hypoplasia of dental enamel
- Full cheeks
- Hypocalcemic tetany

Individuals with Albright hereditary osteodystrophy exhibit short stature, characteristically shortened fourth and fifth metacarpals, rounded facies, and often mild intellectual deficiency.

== Genetics ==
This condition is associated with genetic imprinting. It is thought to be inherited in an autosomal dominant pattern, and seems to be associated with a Gs alpha subunit deficiency.

== Mechanism ==
The mechanism of this condition is due to Gs signaling decrease in hormones having to do with signal transduction which is when a signal from outside cell causes change within the cell (in function). Renal tubule cells only express maternal alleles (variant form of a gene).

== Diagnosis ==
The diagnosis of Albright's hereditary osteodystrophy is based on the following exams below:

- Clinical features
- Serum calcium, phosphorus, PTH
- Urine test for cAMP and phosphorus

== Treatment ==
Treatment consists of maintaining normal levels of calcium, phosphorus, and vitamin D. Phosphate binders, supplementary calcium and vitamin D will be used as required.

== History ==
The disorder bears the name of Fuller Albright, who characterized it in 1942. He was also responsible for naming it "Sebright bantam syndrome," after the Sebright bantam chicken, which demonstrates an analogous hormone insensitivity. Much less commonly, the term Martin-Albright syndrome is used, this refers to Eric Martin.

== See also ==
- Pseudopseudohypoparathyroidism
