= Acrodysostosis =

Acrodysostosis syndrome
- Other names: Arkless-Graham syndrome, Maroteaux-Malamut syndrome

Acrodysostosis is a rare congenital malformation syndrome which involves shortening of the interphalangeal joints of the hands and feet, intellectual disability in approximately 90% of affected children, and peculiar facies. Other common abnormalities include short head (as measured front to back), small broad upturned nose with flat nasal bridge, protruding jaw, increased bone age, intrauterine growth retardation, juvenile arthritis and short stature. Further abnormalities of the skin, genitals, teeth, and skeleton may occur.

== Signs and symptoms ==
Acrodysostosis presents with a wide spectrum of clinical manifestations. The following is a list of conditions and complications associated with acrodysostosis.

=== Bone issues ===
- Skeletal dysplasia (dwarfism, short stature)
- Brachydactyly
- Advanced bone age
- Bone plate fusing
- Scoliosis
- Pain – joint, hip, lower back, wrist

=== Endocrine ===
- Hypothyroidism
- Hypoparathyroidism
- Pseudohypoparathyroidism
- Vitamin D deficiency
- Thyroid cysts
- Type 1 diabetes

=== Behavioural / Developmental / Emotional ===
- Autism Spectrum Disorder (ASD)
- Childhood Apraxia of Speech
- Cognitive impairment
- Sensory issues
- Gross motor delays
- Fine motor delays

=== Craniofacial and dental ===
- Cranial frontal nasal syndrome Midface hypoplasia
- Depressed nasal bridge
- Retrognathia
- Glossoptosis
- High palate
- Mandibular distraction surgery Jaw surgery
- Underbite
- Chalky teeth
- Overcrowded teeth
- Early eruption of adult teeth
- Small, unaligned teeth

=== Cardiology ===
- Hypertension
- Atrial Septal Defect (ASD)
- Aortic Coarctation
- Middle Aortic Syndrome (MAS) Coarctation of abdominal aorta Bradycardia
- Bicuspid aortic valve

== Causes ==
Acrodysostosis is believed to be caused by mutations in the PRKAR1A gene (type 1) or the PDE4D gene (type 2). It has been suggested that the condition might be genetically related i.e. in an autosomal dominant mode of transmission. Both males and females are affected. The disorder has been associated with the older age of parents at the time of conception.

A PRKAR1A mutation has been identified in acrodysostosis with hormone resistance.

== Treatment ==
There are currently no approved treatments or standardised treatment guidelines for acrodysostosis. Management of acrodysostosis typically focuses on addressing specific symptoms that occur in each individual and may include surgery, physical therapy and special education.

== Research ==
A number of transgenic mouse models have been generated that harbour genetic mutations within genes linked to the condition in humans. These mouse models exhibit phenotypes similar to that observed in Acrodysostosis in humans.

== Media ==
The actress Olivia Colman partnered with the charity Acrodysostosis Support and Research to raise awareness for the disease. She participated in a promotional video campaign in December 2020.
