= Parathyroid hormone 1 receptor =

Protein-coding gene in the species Homo sapiens

PTH1R

Identifiers
- Aliases: PTH1R, PFE, PTHR, PTHR1, Parathyroid hormone 1 receptor, EKNS
- External IDs: OMIM: 168468; MGI: 97801; GeneCards: PTH1R
Available structures
PDB	Ortholog search: PDBe RCSB
PDB	List of PDB id codes 1BL1, 3C4M, 3H3G, 3L2J, 4Z8J

Gene location (Human)
Chr.	Chromosome 3 (human)
Band	3p21.31	Start	46,877,721 bp
Band	3p21.31	End	46,903,799 bp

Gene location (Mouse)
Chr.	Chromosome 9 (mouse)
Band	9 F2|9 60.56 cM	Start	110,722,085 bp
Band	9 F2|9 60.56 cM	End	110,747,145 bp
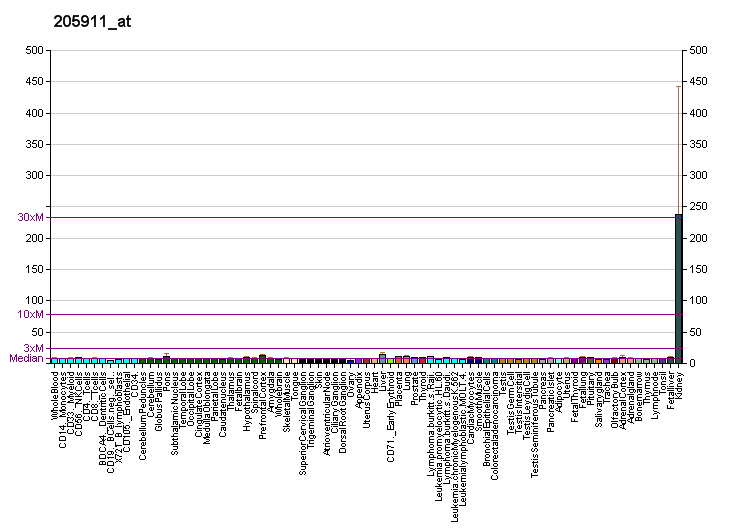
RNA expression pattern
Bgee	Human / Mouse (ortholog); Top expressed in: tibia; human kidney; right adrenal cortex; right lobe of liver; periodontal fiber; metanephric glomerulus; left adrenal cortex; right lung; kidney tubule; apex of heart / Top expressed in: right kidney; proximal tubule; human kidney; body of femur; calvaria; clavicle; dermis; internal carotid artery; membranous bone; ankle; More reference expression data
BioGPS	More reference expression data
Gene ontology
Molecular function	G protein-coupled receptor activity; parathyroid hormone receptor activity; signal transducer activity; protein self-association; peptide hormone binding; protein binding; transmembrane signaling receptor activity; protein homodimerization activity; G protein-coupled peptide receptor activity
Cellular component	cytoplasm; integral component of membrane; membrane; receptor complex; plasma membrane; intracellular anatomical structure; brush border membrane; basolateral plasma membrane; apical plasma membrane; nucleus; integral component of plasma membrane
Biological process	skeletal system development; G protein-coupled receptor signaling pathway; bone mineralization; chondrocyte differentiation; ossification; positive regulation of inositol phosphate biosynthetic process; adenylate cyclase-modulating G protein-coupled receptor signaling pathway; positive regulation of cytosolic calcium ion concentration; G protein-coupled receptor signaling pathway, coupled to cyclic nucleotide second messenger; ageing; cellular calcium ion homeostasis; cell maturation; bone resorption; phospholipase C-activating G protein-coupled receptor signaling pathway; cell surface receptor signaling pathway; positive regulation of cell population proliferation; osteoblast development; signal transduction; negative regulation of cell population proliferation; adenylate cyclase-activating G protein-coupled receptor signaling pathway
Sources:Amigo / QuickGO
Orthologs
Databases	NCBI: entry; OMA: entry
Species	Human	Mouse
Entrez	5745	19228
Ensembl	ENSG00000160801	ENSMUSG00000032492
UniProt	Q03431	P41593
RefSeq (mRNA)	NM_000316; NM_001184744	NM_001083935; NM_001083936; NM_011199
RefSeq (protein)	NP_000307; NP_001171673	NP_001077404; NP_001077405; NP_035329
Location (UCSC)	Chr 3: 46.88 – 46.9 Mb	Chr 9: 110.72 – 110.75 Mb
PubMed search
- Wikidata
View/Edit Human	View/Edit Mouse

Parathyroid hormone/parathyroid hormone-related peptide receptor, also known as parathyroid hormone 1 receptor (PTH1R), is a protein that in humans is encoded by the PTH1R gene. PTH1R functions as a receptor for parathyroid hormone (PTH) and for parathyroid hormone-related protein (PTHrP), also called parathyroid hormone-like hormone (PTHLH).

== Function ==
This "classical" PTH receptor is expressed in high levels in bone and kidney and regulates calcium ion homeostasis through activation of adenylate cyclase and phospholipase C. In bone, it is expressed on the surface of osteoblasts. When the receptor is activated through PTH binding, osteoblasts express RANKL (Receptor Activator of Nuclear Factor kB Ligand), which binds to RANK (Receptor Activator of Nuclear Factor kB) on osteoclasts. This turns on osteoclasts to ultimately increase the resorption rate.

== Mechanism ==
It is a member of the secretin family of G protein-coupled receptors. The activity of this receptor is mediated by G_{s} protein, which activates adenylyl cyclase. Besides this, they also activate the phosphatidylinositol-calcium second messenger system.

== Pathology ==
Defects in this receptor are known to be the cause of Jansen's metaphyseal chondrodysplasia (JMC) and chondrodysplasia Blomstrand type (BOCD) as well as enchondromatosis and primary failure of tooth eruption.

== Interactions ==
Parathyroid hormone 1 receptor has been shown to interact with Sodium-hydrogen exchange regulatory cofactor 2 and Sodium-hydrogen antiporter 3 regulator 1.

== See also ==
- Parathyroid hormone receptor
