= Parathyroid hormone =

Mammalian protein found in humans

PTH

Identifiers
- Aliases: PTH, PTH1, parathyroid hormone, Parathyroid hormone, FIH1
- External IDs: OMIM: 168450; MGI: 97799; HomoloGene: 266; GeneCards: PTH; OMA:PTH - orthologs
Available structures
PDB	Ortholog search: PDBe RCSB
PDB	List of PDB id codes 1BWX, 1ET1, 1FVY, 1HPH, 1HPY, 1HTH, 1ZWA, 1ZWB, 1ZWD, 1ZWE, 1ZWF, 1ZWG, 2L1X, 3C4M

Gene location (Human)
Chr.	Chromosome 11 (human)
Band	11p15.3	Start	13,492,054 bp
Band	11p15.3	End	13,496,181 bp

Gene location (Mouse)
Chr.	Chromosome 7 (mouse)
Band	7 F1|7 59.19 cM	Start	112,984,787 bp
Band	7 F1|7 59.19 cM	End	112,987,777 bp
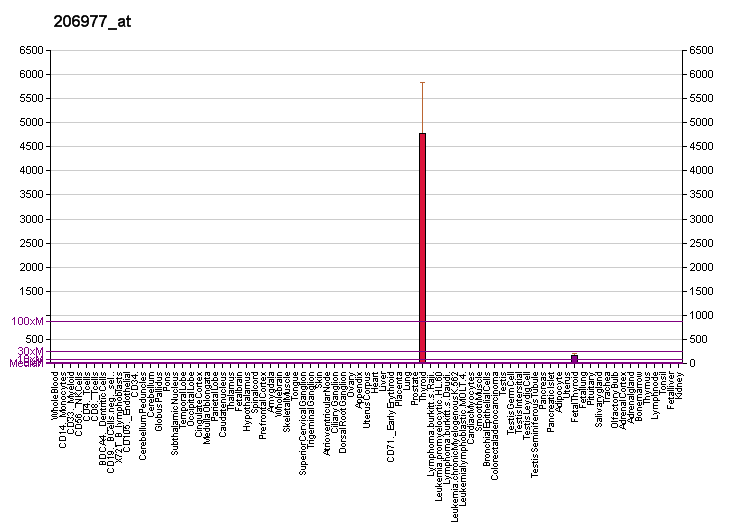
RNA expression pattern
Bgee	Human / Mouse (ortholog); Top expressed in: testicle; retinal pigment epithelium; muscle tissue; body of stomach; fundus; embryo; fallopian tube; smooth muscle tissue; ganglionic eminence; mammary gland / Top expressed in: trachea; parathyroid; esophagus; superior colliculus; medulla oblongata; pancreas; submandibular gland; morula; thymus; gastrula; More reference expression data
BioGPS	More reference expression data
Gene ontology
Molecular function	transcription factor activity, RNA polymerase II distal enhancer sequence-specific binding; hormone activity; parathyroid hormone receptor binding; type 1 parathyroid hormone receptor binding; protein N-terminus binding; receptor ligand activity; peptide hormone receptor binding; DNA-binding transcription factor activity, RNA polymerase II-specific; protein binding
Cellular component	intracellular anatomical structure; extracellular region; extracellular space
Biological process	positive regulation of signal transduction; positive regulation of cell proliferation in bone marrow; positive regulation of osteoclast proliferation; response to fibroblast growth factor; hormone-mediated apoptotic signaling pathway; cAMP metabolic process; response to ethanol; response to parathyroid hormone; skeletal system development; positive regulation of ossification; response to lead ion; response to nutrient levels; G protein-coupled receptor signaling pathway; response to vitamin D; negative regulation of apoptotic process in bone marrow cell; negative regulation of transcription by RNA polymerase II; cellular macromolecule biosynthetic process; cellular calcium ion homeostasis; homeostasis of number of cells within a tissue; response to cadmium ion; Rho protein signal transduction; positive regulation of glucose import; positive regulation of glycogen biosynthetic process; bone resorption; positive regulation of bone mineralization; regulation of gene expression; positive regulation of transcription by RNA polymerase II; cell-cell signaling; activation of phospholipase C activity; negative regulation of chondrocyte differentiation; positive regulation of inositol phosphate biosynthetic process; negative regulation of bone mineralization involved in bone maturation; regulation of signaling receptor activity; adenylate cyclase-activating G protein-coupled receptor signaling pathway; calcium ion transport; magnesium ion homeostasis; bone mineralization; phosphate ion homeostasis; calcium ion homeostasis; negative regulation of calcium ion transport
Sources:Amigo / QuickGO
Orthologs
Species	Human	Mouse
Entrez	5741	19226
Ensembl	ENSG00000152266	ENSMUSG00000059077
UniProt	P01270	Q9Z0L6
RefSeq (mRNA)	NM_000315; NM_001316352	NM_020623
RefSeq (protein)	NP_000306; NP_001303281	NP_065648
Location (UCSC)	Chr 11: 13.49 – 13.5 Mb	Chr 7: 112.98 – 112.99 Mb
PubMed search
- Wikidata
View/Edit Human	View/Edit Mouse

Parathyroid hormone (PTH), also known as parathormone or parathyrin, is a peptide hormone secreted by the parathyroid glands. It plays a critical role in regulating serum calcium and phosphate levels through its actions on bone, kidneys, and the small intestine. PTH increases serum calcium levels and is opposed by calcitonin. It also promotes the synthesis of calcitriol, the active form of vitamin D.

PTH is secreted in response to low blood serum calcium (Ca^{2+}) levels and is a key regulator of bone remodeling, the continuous process of bone resorption and formation. PTH indirectly stimulates osteoclast activity, promoting the release of calcium from the bone matrix to restore serum calcium levels. The bones serve as a reservoir of calcium, releasing it as needed to maintain homeostasis in the face of fluctuating metabolism, stress, and nutritional status.

Produced primarily by the chief cells of the parathyroid glands, PTH is a polypeptide prohormone (precursor to a hormone) consisting of 84 amino acids and has a molecular mass of approximately 9500 Da. Its gene is located on chromosome 11 in humans.

PTH exerts its biological effects via two main receptors. The Parathyroid hormone 1 receptor, activated by the 34 N-terminal amino acids of PTH, is highly expressed in bone and kidney cells. The Parathyroid hormone 2 receptor is predominantly found in the central nervous system, pancreas, testes, and placenta. The hormone has a short half-life of approximately 4 minutes. Dysregulation of PTH secretion, as seen in conditions like hypoparathyroidism, hyperparathyroidism, and paraneoplastic syndromes, can result in bone disease, hypocalcemia, or hypercalcemia.

== Structure ==
hPTH-(1-84) crystallizes as a slightly bent, long, helical dimer. The extended helical conformation of hPTH-(1-84) is the likely bioactive conformation. The N-terminal fragment 1-34 of parathyroid hormone (PTH) has been crystallized and the structure has been refined to 0.9 Å resolution.

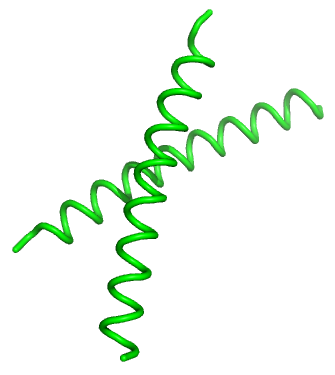
Helical dimer structure of hPTH-(1-34)

== Function ==
=== Regulation of serum calcium ===
The parathyroid gland releases PTH which keeps calcium in homeostasis.

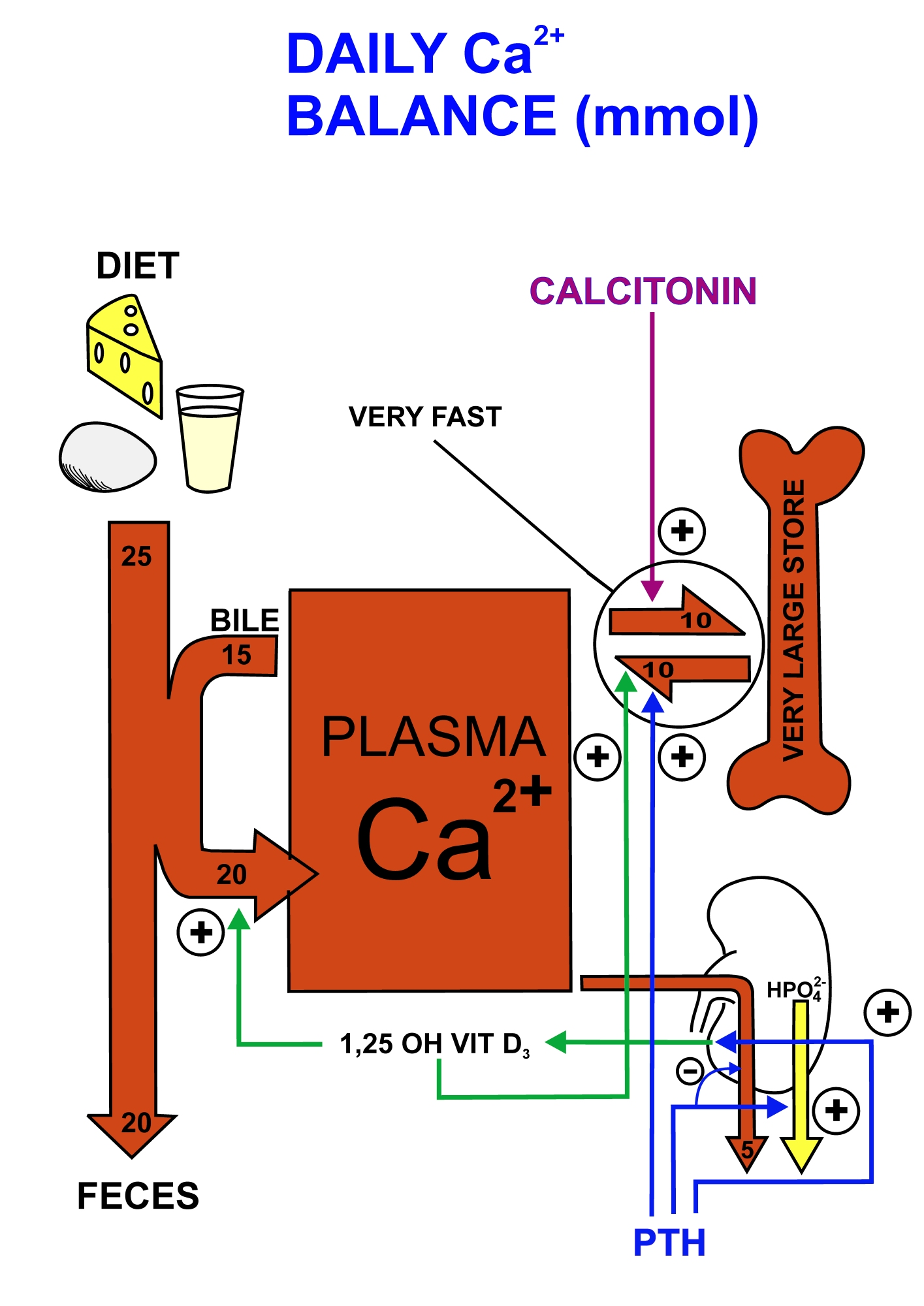
A diagrammatic representation of the movements of calcium ions into and out of the blood plasma (the central square labeled PLASMA Ca^{2+}) in an adult in calcium balance: The widths of the red arrows indicating movement into and out of the plasma are roughly in proportion to the daily amounts of calcium moved in the indicated directions. The size of the central square is not in proportion to the size of the diagrammatic bone, which represents the calcium present in the skeleton, and contains about 25,000 mmol (or 1 kg) of calcium compared to the 9 mmol (360 mg) dissolved in the blood plasma. The differently colored narrow arrows indicate where the specified hormones act, and their effects (“+” means stimulates; “-“ means inhibits) when their plasma levels are high. PTH is parathyroid hormone, 1,25 OH VIT D_{3} is calcitriol or 1,25 dihydroxyvitamin D_{3}, and calcitonin is a hormone secreted by the thyroid gland when the plasma ionized calcium level is high or rising. The diagram does not show the extremely small amounts of calcium that move into and out of the cells of the body, nor does it indicate the calcium that is bound to the extracellular proteins (in particular the plasma proteins) or to plasma phosphate.

Parathyroid hormone regulates serum calcium through its effects on bone, kidney, and the intestine:

In bone, PTH enhances the release of calcium from the large reservoir contained in the bones. Bone resorption is the normal destruction of bone by osteoclasts, which are indirectly stimulated by PTH. Stimulation is indirect since osteoclasts do not have a receptor for PTH; rather, PTH binds to osteoblasts, the cells responsible for creating bone. Binding stimulates osteoblasts to increase their expression of RANKL and inhibits their secretion of osteoprotegerin (OPG). Free OPG competitively binds to RANKL as a decoy receptor, preventing RANKL from interacting with RANK, a receptor for RANKL. The binding of RANKL to RANK (facilitated by the decreased amount of OPG available for binding the excess RANKL) stimulates osteoclast precursors, which are of a monocyte lineage, to fuse. The resulting multinucleated cells are osteoclasts, which ultimately mediate bone resorption. Estrogen also regulates this pathway through its effects on PTH. Estrogen suppresses T cell TNF production by regulating T cell differentiation and activity in the bone marrow, thymus, and peripheral lymphoid organs. In the bone marrow, estrogen downregulates the proliferation of hematopoietic stem cells through an IL-7-dependent mechanism.

In the kidney, around 250 mmol of calcium ions are filtered into the glomerular filtrate per day. Most of this (245 mmol/d) is reabsorbed from the tubular fluid, leaving about 5 mmol/d to be excreted in the urine. This reabsorption occurs throughout the tubule (most, 60–70%, of it in the proximal tubule), except in the thin segment of the loop of Henle. Circulating parathyroid hormone only influences the reabsorption that occurs in the distal tubules and the renal collecting ducts (but see Footnote (Note: This reduction in the rate of calcium excretion via the urine is a minor effect of high parathyroid hormone levels in the blood. The main determinant of the amount of calcium excreted into the urine per day is the plasma ionized calcium concentration itself. The plasma parathyroid hormone (PTH) concentration only increases or decreases the amount of calcium excreted at any specified plasma ionized calcium concentration. Thus, in primary hyperparathyroidism, the quantity of calcium excreted in the urine per day is increased despite the high levels of PTH in the blood, because hyperparathyroidism results in hypercalcemia, which increases the urinary calcium concentration (hypercalcuria) despite the moderately increased rate of calcium reabsorption from the renal tubular fluid caused by PTH's direct effect on those tubules. Renal stones are, therefore, often a first indication of hyperparathyroidism, especially since the hypercalcuria is accompanied by an increase in urinary phosphate excretion (a direct result of the high plasma PTH levels). Together the calcium and phosphate tend to precipitate out as water-insoluble salts, which readily form solid "stones".)). A more important effect of PTH on the kidney is, however, its inhibition of the reabsorption of phosphate (HPO_{4}^{2−}) from the tubular fluid, resulting in a decrease in the plasma phosphate concentration. Phosphate ions form water-insoluble salts with calcium. Thus, a decrease in the phosphate concentration of the blood plasma (for a given total calcium concentration) increases the amount of calcium that is ionized. A third important effect of PTH on the kidney is its stimulation of the conversion of 25-hydroxy vitamin D into 1,25-dihydroxy vitamin D (calcitriol), which is released into the circulation. This latter form of vitamin D is the active hormone which stimulates calcium uptake from the intestine.

Via the kidney, PTH enhances the absorption of calcium in the intestine by increasing the production of activated vitamin D. Vitamin D activation occurs in the kidney. PTH up-regulates 25-hydroxyvitamin D_{3} 1-alpha-hydroxylase, the enzyme responsible for 1-alpha hydroxylation of 25-hydroxy vitamin D, converting vitamin D to its active form (1,25-dihydroxy vitamin D). This activated form of vitamin D increases the absorption of calcium (as Ca^{2+} ions) by the intestine via calbindin.

PTH was one of the first hormones to be shown to use the G-protein adenylyl cyclase second messenger system.

=== Regulation of serum phosphate ===
PTH reduces the reabsorption of phosphate from the proximal tubule of the kidney, which means more phosphate is excreted through the urine.

However, PTH enhances the uptake of phosphate from the intestine and bones into the blood. In the bone, slightly more calcium than phosphate is released from the breakdown of bone. In the intestines, absorption of both calcium and phosphate is mediated by an increase in activated vitamin D. The absorption of phosphate is not as dependent on vitamin D as is that of calcium. The result of PTH release is a small net drop in the serum concentration of phosphate.

=== Vitamin D synthesis ===
PTH upregulates the activity of 1-α-hydroxylase enzyme, which converts 25-hydroxycholecalciferol, the major circulating form of inactive vitamin D, into 1,25-dihydroxycholecalciferol, the active form of vitamin D, in the kidney.

==== Interactive pathway map ====
Click on genes, proteins and metabolites below to link to respective articles. (Note: The interactive pathway map can be edited at WikiPathways: "VitaminDSynthesis_WP1531".)

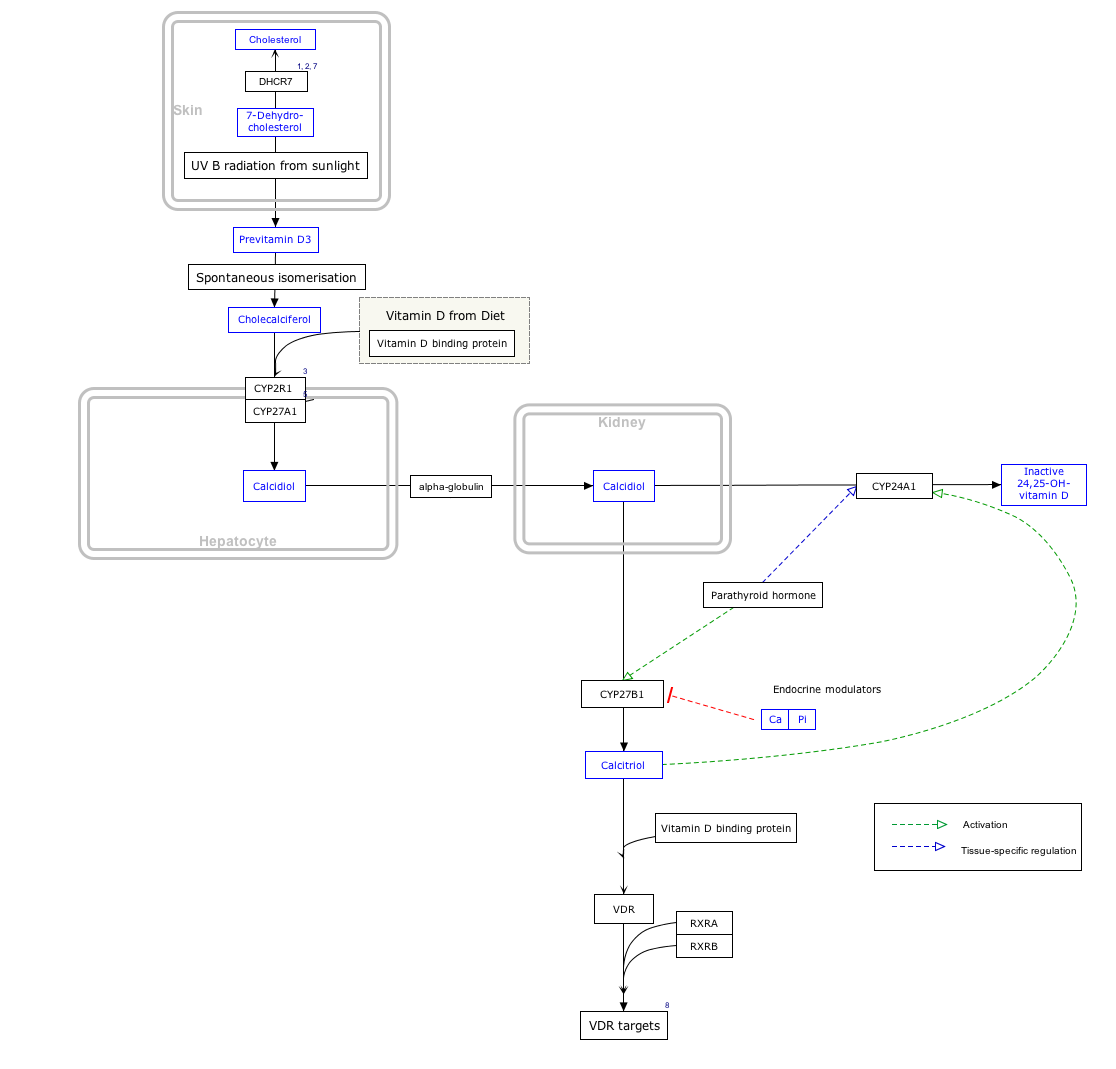

Vitamin D Synthesis Pathway (view / edit)

== Regulation of PTH secretion ==
Secretion of parathyroid hormone is determined chiefly by serum ionized calcium concentration through negative feedback. Parathyroid cells express calcium-sensing receptors on the cell surface. PTH is secreted when [Ca^{2+}] is decreased (calcitonin is secreted when serum calcium levels are elevated). The G-protein-coupled calcium receptors bind extracellular calcium and may be found on the surface on a wide variety of cells distributed in the brain, heart, skin, stomach, C cells, and other tissues. In the parathyroid gland, high concentrations of extracellular calcium result in activation of the Gq G-protein coupled cascade through the action of phospholipase C. This hydrolyzes phosphatidylinositol 4,5-bisphosphate to liberate intracellular messengers IP3 and diacylglycerol (DAG). Ultimately, these two messengers result in a release of calcium from intracellular stores into the cytoplasmic space. Hence a high extracellular calcium concentration leads to an increase in the cytoplasmic calcium concentration. In contrast to the mechanism that most secretory cells use, this high cytoplasmic calcium concentration inhibits the fusion of vesicles containing granules of preformed PTH with the membrane of the parathyroid cell, and thus inhibits release of PTH.

In the parathyroids, magnesium serves this role in stimulus-secretion coupling. A mild decrease in serum magnesium levels stimulates the reabsorptive activity PTH has on the kidneys. Severe hypomagnesemia inhibits PTH secretion and also causes resistance to PTH, leading to a form of hypoparathyroidism that is reversible.

=== Stimulators ===
- Decreased serum [Ca^{2+}].
- Mild decreases in serum [Mg^{2+}].
- An increase in serum phosphate (increased phosphate causes it to complex with serum calcium, forming calcium phosphate, which reduces stimulation of Ca-sensitive receptors (CaSr) that do not sense calcium phosphate, triggering an increase in PTH).
- Adrenaline
- Histamine

=== Inhibitors ===
- Increased serum [Ca^{2+}].
- Severe decreases in serum [Mg^{2+}], which also produces symptoms of hypoparathyroidism (such as hypocalcemia).
- Calcitriol
- Increase in serum phosphate. Fibroblast growth factor-23 (FGF23) is produced in osteoblasts (from bone) in response to increases in serum phosphate (Pi). It binds to the fibroblast growth factor receptor of the parathyroid and suppresses PTH release. This may seem contradictory because PTH actually helps rid the blood of phosphates but it is also causes release of phosphate into the blood from bone resorption. FGF23 inhibits PTH and then takes its place helping inhibit re-absorption of phosphate in the kidney without the phosphate releasing effect on bones.

== Clinical significance ==
=== Disorders ===
Hyperparathyroidism, the presence of excessive amounts of parathyroid hormone in the blood, occurs in two very distinct sets of circumstances. Primary hyperparathyroidism is due to autonomous, abnormal hypersecretion of PTH from the parathyroid gland, while secondary hyperparathyroidism is an appropriately high PTH level seen as a physiological response to hypocalcemia. A low level of PTH in the blood is known as hypoparathyroidism and is most commonly due to damage to or removal of parathyroid glands during thyroid surgery.

There are a number of rare but well-described genetic conditions affecting parathyroid hormone metabolism, including pseudohypoparathyroidism, familial hypocalciuric hypercalcemia, and autosomal dominant hypercalciuric hypocalcemia. Of note, PTH is unchanged in pseudopseudohypoparathyroidism. In osteoporotic women, administration of an exogenous parathyroid hormone analogue (teriparatide, by daily injection) superimposed on estrogen therapy produced increases in bone mass and reduced vertebral and nonvertebral fractures by 45–65%.

=== Measurement ===
PTH can be measured in the blood in several different forms: intact PTH; N-terminal PTH; mid-molecule PTH, and C-terminal PTH, and different tests are used in different clinical situations. The level may be stated in pg/dL or pmol/L (sometimes abbreviated mmol/L); multiply by 0.1060 to convert from pg/dL to pmol/L.

A US source states the average PTH level to be 8–51 pg/mL. In the UK the biological reference range is considered to be 1.6–6.9 pmol/L. Normal total plasma calcium level ranges from 8.5 to 10.2 mg/dL (2.12 mmol/L to 2.55 mmol/L).

The PTH assay may be liable to interference in rare cases.

=== Clinical interpretive guide ===
The intact PTH and calcium normal ranges are different for age; calcium is also different for sex.

Clinical Condition	Intact PTH	Calcium
Normal Parathyroid	Normal	Normal
Hypoparathyroidism	Low or Low Normal (Note: Low Normal or Normal only for Quest Lab, not LabCorp which is only Low or High)	Low
Hyperparathyroidism
Primary	High or Normal	High
Secondary	High	Normal or Low
Tertiary (Note: Both primary and tertiary hyperparathyroidism may have high PTH and high calcium. Tertiary is differentiated from primary hyperparathyroidism by a history of chronic kidney failure and secondary hyperparathyroidism.)	High	High
Non-Parathyroid Hypercalcemia	Low or Low Normal	High

=== Medical uses ===
==== Recombinant human parathyroid hormone ====
Recombinant human parathyroid hormone is an artificially manufactured form of the parathyroid hormone used to help treat hypoparathyroidism (under-active parathyroid glands) and osteoporosis.

Recombinant human parathyroid hormone (Preotact) received market authorization in the European Union in April 2006 to treat osteoporosis in postmenopausal women at high risk of fractures. Preotact marketing authorisation was later voluntarily withdrawn in 2014 by the holder NPS Pharma. FDA approval (as Preos) was not granted in the US for the same indication due to hypercalcemia and injection device issues.

Recombinant human parathyroid hormone (Natpara) was approved for medical use in the United States in January 2015, and received (as Natpar) conditional market authorization in the European Union in February 2017 as orphan drug. On 2019 Natpara was recalled in the US due to rubber particle issues emerging from daily use of the cartridge. Takeda announced in 2022 its decision to stop manufacturing Natpara/Natpar globally at the end of 2024.

==== Teriparatide ====
Teriparatide, sold under the brand name Forteo among others, is a form of parathyroid hormone (PTH) consisting of the first (N-terminus) 34 amino acids, which is the portion of the hormone activating the Parathyroid hormone 1 receptor. It is an effective anabolic (promoting bone formation) agent used in the treatment of some forms of osteoporosis. Teriparatide is a recombinant human parathyroid hormone analog (PTH 1-34). It has an identical sequence to the 34 N-terminal amino acids of the 84-amino acid human parathyroid hormone.

== See also ==
- Disorders of calcium metabolism
- Parathyroid hormone family
- Parathyroid hormone-related protein
