= Dent's disease =

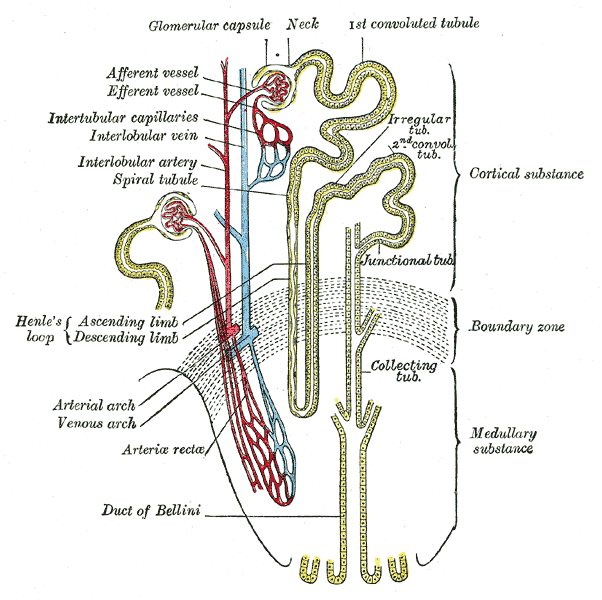
- Nephron of the kidney without juxtaglomerular apparatus
- Specialty: Urology
- Frequency: 1.25520227e-05%
- Named after: Charles Enrique Dent

Dent's disease (or Dent disease) is a rare X-linked recessive inherited condition that affects the proximal renal tubules of the kidney. It is one cause of Fanconi syndrome, and is characterized by tubular proteinuria, excess calcium in the urine, formation of calcium kidney stones, nephrocalcinosis, and chronic kidney failure.

"Dent's disease" is often used to describe an entire group of familial disorders, including X-linked recessive nephrolithiasis with kidney failure, X-linked recessive hypophosphatemic rickets, and both Japanese and idiopathic low-molecular-weight proteinuria. About 60% of patients have mutations in the CLCN5 gene (Dent 1), which encodes a kidney-specific chloride/proton antiporter, and 15% of patients have mutations in the OCRL1 gene (Dent 2).

== Signs and symptoms ==
Dent's disease often produces the following signs and symptoms:

- Extreme thirst combined with dehydration, which leads to frequent urination
- Nephrolithiasis (kidney stones)
- Hypercalciuria (high urine calcium - >300 mg/d or >4 mg/kg per d with normal levels blood/serum calcium)
- Aminoaciduria (amino acids in urine)
- Phosphaturia (phosphate in urine)
- Glycosuria (glucose in urine)
- Kaliuresis (potassium in urine)
- Hyperuricosuria (excessive amounts of uric acid in the urine)
- Impaired urinary acidification
- Rickets

In a study of 25 patients with Dent's disease, 9 of 15 men, and one of 10 women had end-stage kidney disease by the age of 47.

== Genetics ==
X-linked recessive inheritance

Three-dimensional homology model of human CLC-5 based on the structure of ClC-ec1 (7) showing the locations of each mutated residue

=== Dent disease 1 ===
Dent's disease is a X-linked recessive disorder. The males are prone to manifesting symptoms in early adulthood with symptoms of calculi, rickets or even with kidney failure in more severe cases.

In humans, gene CLCN5 is located on chromosome Xp11.22, and has a 2238-bp coding sequence that consists of 11 exons that span 25 to 30 kb of genomic DNA and encode a 746-amino-acid protein. CLCN5 belongs to the family of voltage-gated chloride channel genes (CLCN1-CLCN7, CLCKa and CLCKb) that have about 12 transmembrane domains. These chloride channels have an important role in the control of membrane excitability, transepithelial transport, and possibly cell volume.

The mechanisms by which CLC-5 dysfunction results in hypercalciuria and the other features of Dent's disease remain to be elucidated. The identification of additional CLCN5 mutations may help in these studies.

=== Dent disease 2 ===
Dent disease 2 (nephrolithiasis type 2) is associated with the OCRL gene. Both Lowe syndrome (oculocerebrorenal syndrome) and Dent disease can be caused by truncating or missense mutations in OCRL.

== Diagnosis ==
Diagnosis is based on genetic study of CLCN5 gene.

== Treatment ==
As of today, no agreed-upon treatment of Dent's disease is known and no therapy has been formally accepted. Most treatment measures are supportive in nature:

- Kidney transplantation is a treatment option for patients who progress to end-stage kidney disease, and the disease does not recur in the transplanted kidney.
- Thiazide diuretics (i.e. hydrochlorothiazide) have been used with success in reducing the calcium output in urine, but they are also known to cause hypokalemia.
  - In rats with diabetes insipidus, thiazide diuretics inhibit the NaCl cotransporter in the renal distal convoluted tubule, leading indirectly to less water and solutes being delivered to the distal tubule. The impairment of Na transport in the distal convoluted tubule induces natriuresis and water loss, while increasing the reabsorption of calcium in this segment in a manner unrelated to sodium transport.
- Amiloride also increases distal tubular calcium reabsorption and has been used as a therapy for idiopathic hypercalciuria.
  - A combination of 25 mg of chlorthalidone plus 5 mg of amiloride daily led to a substantial reduction in urine calcium in Dent's patients, but urine pH was "significantly higher in patients with Dent's disease than in those with idiopathic hypercalciuria (P < 0.03), and supersaturation for uric acid was consequently lower (P < 0.03)."
- For patients with osteomalacia, vitamin D or derivatives have been employed, apparently with success.
- Some lab tests on mice with CLC-5-related tubular damage showed a high-citrate diet preserved kidney function and delayed progress of kidney disease.

== History ==
Dent's disease was first described by Charles Enrique Dent and M. Friedman in 1964, when they reported two unrelated British boys with rickets associated with renal tubular damage characterized by hypercalciuria, hyperphosphaturia, proteinuria, and aminoaciduria. This set of symptoms was not given a name until 30 years later, when the nephrologist Oliver Wrong more fully described the disease. Wrong had studied with Dent and chose to name the disease after his mentor. Dent's disease is a genetic disorder caused by mutations in the gene CLCN5, which encodes a kidney-specific voltage-gated chloride channel, a 746-amino-acid protein (CLC-5) with 12 to 13 transmembrane domains. It manifests itself through low-molecular-weight proteinuria, hypercalciuria, aminoaciduria and hypophosphataemia. Because of its rather rare occurrence, Dent's disease is often diagnosed as idiopathic hypercalciuria, i.e., excess calcium in urine with undetermined causes.
