= Proximal renal tubular acidosis =

- Specialty: Nephrology

Proximal renal tubular acidosis (pRTA) or type 2 renal tubular acidosis (RTA) is a type of RTA caused by a failure of the proximal tubular cells to reabsorb filtered bicarbonate from the urine, leading to urinary bicarbonate wasting and subsequent acidemia. The distal intercalated cells function normally, so the acidemia is less severe than dRTA and the urine can acidify to a pH of less than 5.3. pRTA also has several causes, and may occasionally be present as a solitary defect, but is usually associated with a more generalized dysfunction of the proximal tubular cells called Fanconi syndrome where there is also phosphaturia, glycosuria, aminoaciduria, uricosuria and tubular proteinuria.

Patients with type 2 RTA are also typically hypokalemic due to a combination of secondary hyperaldosteronism, and potassium urinary losses – though serum potassium levels may be falsely elevated because of acidosis. Administration of bicarbonate prior to potassium supplementation might lead to worsened hypokalemia, as potassium shifts intracellularly with alkalinization.

The principal feature of Fanconi syndrome is bone demineralization (osteomalacia or rickets) due to phosphate and vitamin D wasting.

== Causes ==
Etiologies of proximal RTA may be divided into primary, isolated causes and secondary causes, or those related to another disease. Primary causes are frequently single gene hereditary disorders. Secondary disorders can be divided into familial disorders, acquired disorders, and those related to other clinical entities.

Primary disorders

- Autosomal dominant
- Autosomal recessive with ocular abnormalities (caused by SLC4A4 mutation)
- Sporadic of infancy (possibly related to immaturity of NHE-3)

Secondary disorders

Familial disorders

- Cystinosis
- Galactosemia
- Glycogen storage disease (type I)
- Hereditary fructose intolerance
- Lowe syndrome
- Tyrosinemia
- Wilson's disease

Acquired disorders

- Amyloidosis
- Multiple myeloma
- Paroxysmal nocturnal hemoglobinuria
- Toxins, such as HAART, ifosfamide, lead, and cadmium

== Diagnosis ==
Diagnosis of proximal renal tubular acidosis is done by measuring the level of fractional excretion of bicarbonate in the urine. Since in proximal renal tubular acidosis patients the nephron is unable to reabsorb bicarbonate, the level of bicarbonate is going to be high in the urine.

== Treatment ==
Treatment consists of oral bicarbonate supplementation. However, this will increase urinary bicarbonate wasting and may well promote a bicarbonate diuresis. The amount of bicarbonate given may have to be very large to stay ahead of the urinary losses. Correction with oral bicarbonate may exacerbate urinary potassium losses and precipitate hypokalemia. As with dRTA, reversal of the chronic acidosis should reverse bone demineralization.

Thiazide diuretics can also be used as a treatment by making use of contraction alkalosis caused by them.

== See also ==
- Distal renal tubular acidosis
- Renal tubular acidosis
