= Phosphate nephropathy =

- Other names: Nephrocalcinosis
- Specialty: Nephrology
- Symptoms: Similar with Acute kidney disease
- Complications: Acute kidney disease and Chronic kidney disease
- Types: Kidney injury
- Causes: Use of sodium phosphate
- Risk factors: Development of Acute kidney disease
- Diagnostic method: Formation of calcium phosphate crystals
- Prevention: Alternative bowel-preparation agents
- Treatment: Renal replacement therapy

Phosphate nephropathy or nephrocalcinosis is an adverse renal condition that arises with a formation of phosphate crystals within the kidney's tubules. This renal insufficiency is associated with the use of oral sodium phosphate (OSP) such as C.B. Fleet's Phospho soda and Salix's Visocol, for bowel cleansing prior to a colonoscopy.

According to the U.S. Food and Drug Administration (FDA), the potential risk factors of this complication include pre-existing kidney disease, increased age, female gender, dehydration, comorbidities such as diabetes mellitus and hypertension, and concurrent treatment with hypertensive medications (ACE inhibitors and angiotensin receptor blockers) and medications that affect renal perfusion (Nonsteroidal anti-inflammatory drug or NSAIDs and diuretics). This complication can be diagnosed with renal tests and biomarkers in laboratories including histochemical staining of renal biopsy specimens, the measure of creatinine level, GFR level, and urine output, urine microscopy, CT scanning, and urinalysis.

Phosphate nephropathy may also lead to further renal complications including acute kidney diseases and chronic kidney diseases, or the abrupt and gradual loss of kidney function over time. Different management approaches involve the use of alternative bowel preparation agents and increasing patients' risk assessment among healthcare professionals, including nephrologists, gastroenterologists, and renal pathologists. Other agents used for bowel preparation (e.g. magnesium citrate or PEG-3350 & electrolyte-based purgatives such as Colyte or Golytely) do not carry this risk.

According to the U.S. Food and Drug Administration (FDA), "acute phosphate nephropathy is a rare, serious adverse event that has been associated with the use of OSPs. The occurrence of these events was previously described in an Information for Healthcare Professionals sheet and an FDA Science Paper issued in May 2006. Additional cases of acute phosphate nephropathy have been reported to FDA and described in the literature since these were issued."

== Signs and symptoms ==
Patients with phosphate nephropathy have variable outcomes, either being recognized as developing acute kidney injury, the sudden onset of renal failure, or being undiagnosed. As the deposition of calcium phosphate crystals are detected at the renal tubules following the use of OSP, the symptoms of phosphate nephropathy are similar to acute tubular necrosis, an intrinsic renal injury. For example, events including diarrhea, vomiting, dehydration, sepsis, and hypotension following the colonoscopy, can indicate the risk of phosphate nephropathy and raise the concern for acute tubular necrosis. The outcomes of hypotension and dehydration are dry mucous membrane, decreased skin turgor, and cold extremities, which can be used to notify the abnormal renal perfusion. As there is a gap between the first administration of OSP and the onset of recognizable symptoms, many cases of phosphate nephropathy are overlooked and not recommended to biopsy for further investigation.

The transient hyperphosphatasemia, the electrolyte disorder with elevated phosphate level in the blood, is found to be correlated with the use of OSP after colonoscopy. Significant electrolyte abnormalities including hypocalcemia, hypernatremia, and hypomagnesemia are also the outcomes of the use of OSP. As these detection tests are mostly operated at the laboratory level, phosphate nephropathy incidents are widely under-recognized and overlooked.

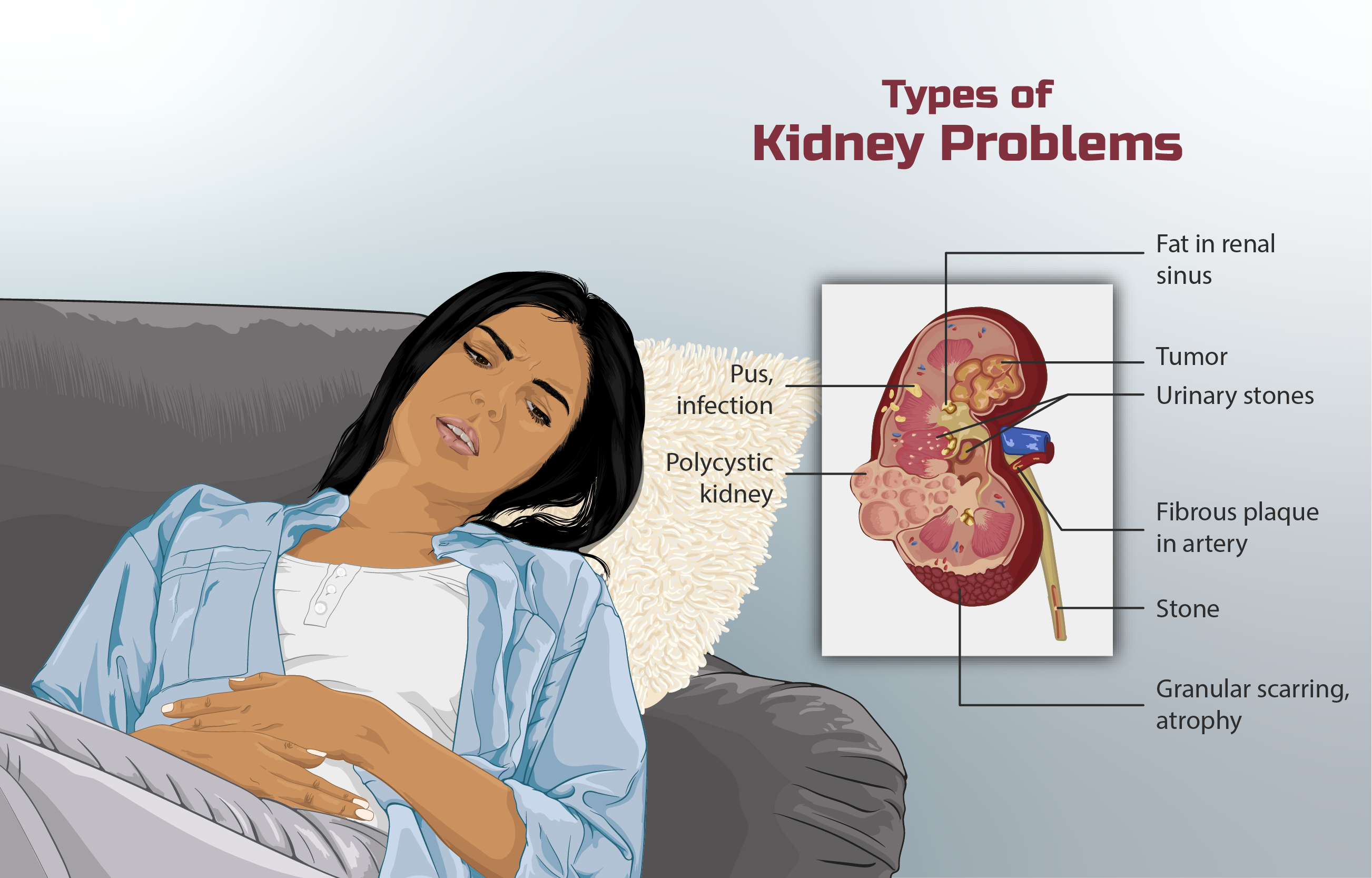
Depiction of different adverse renal conditions. Phosphate nephropathy or deposition of calcium phosphate within renal tubules belongs to the urinary stone problems.

== Risk factors ==
According to the FDA, caution is required to consider prior use of OSP, especially in patients with the following potential risk factors. For instance, people older than 55, female gender, people with a history of kidney diseases if their GFR level is less than 60 mL/min, people who recurrently on antihypertensive treatment with NSAIDs, ARBs, ACEIs, and diuretics, people who have lower fluid intake and less bowel movements, people who have underlying systemic and gastrointestinal diseases, and a short interval between OSP administrations (less than 12 hours interval). The risk of acquiring phosphate nephropathy was reported to increase in parallel with the number of these listed risk factors.

Older people are particularly at risk when using OSP for colonoscopy, as they have lower fluid intake, have intrinsically less bowel movements, and often have antihypertensive or nephrotoxic drugs. It is also reported that people with comorbidities including diabetes mellitus, hypertension, and other metabolic syndromes will have a higher risk of phosphate nephropathy.

== Pathophysiology ==
The efficient elimination of phosphorus depends on the kidney's filtration rate and the phosphorus bioavailability in the blood. Most renal phosphorus is absorbed at the proximal tubules in comparison to the distal nephron. The elevated phosphorus load, or hyperphosphatemia, can reduce the phosphorus reabsorption in the kidney's proximal tubular within minutes of OSP ingestion. This leads to hypovolemia, a large distribution of phosphate at the distal nephron without being completely reabsorbed at the proximal tubules. Hypovolemia results in an increase of proximal salt and water at the descending limb of the loop of Henle, where calcium and phosphate are unable to permeate. Hypovolemia collectively combines with the ongoing water and salt reabsorption in the proximal tubules, enhances the calcium phosphate precipitation within the renal tubular lumen.

Parathyroid hormone-induced calcium precipitation also contributes to the formation of calcium phosphate crystals, which thus impairs the renal function. An excess phosphorus triggers calcium precipitation and reduces calcium absorption in the gastrointestinal tract. This reduces the ionized calcium concentration in blood, which further induces a compensatory parathyroid hormone response. Parathyroid hormone is reported to accelerate urinary calcium load, which results in the formation of calcium phosphate crystals in the renal distal tubules and collecting ducts.

When the calcium phosphate crystals bind to the tubular epithelial cells, the reactive oxygen species are released, which further impair the renal excretory pathway. The use of OSP causes an increase in phosphatemia and impairs renal perfusion, which later leads to acute kidney injury and chronic kidney disease. The calcification of major arteries like coronary arteries and cardiovascular complication risks can be the result of impaired kidney function in excreting calcium and phosphate.

== Diagnosis ==
Phosphate nephropathy can be diagnosed via different types of assessment, most of which are also used to detect acute kidney injury and chronic kidney disease. Most phosphate nephropathy incidents are diagnosed weeks or months after taking OSP, due to its clinical silence. For example, these assessments include the measurement of serum phosphorus with an elevation of more than 3 mmol/L, the finding of an elevated serum creatinine level and a decrease in glomerular filtration rate (GFR), urine microscopy for crystallization detection, the image of calcium phosphate crystals deposited through CT scanning, urinalysis, renal biopsy specimens with histochemical staining for calcium phosphate. These assessments are generally carried out within the laboratory environment, in which longer waiting time is required to attain the results.

The measurement of serum creatinine level and GFR are used to indicate the severity stage of acute kidney injury or the duration of impairment of kidney function, when early-onset phosphate nephropathy occurs. The more than 1.5 fold increase in serum creatinine level, or the more than 25% decrease in GFR, or the decrease in urine output less than 0.5mL/kg/h within 6 hours, signify the risk of attaining acute kidney injury after ingestion of OPS.

Urine microscopy is reported to be an accurate diagnostic assessment for underlying crystalline-induced nephropathy, either endogenous or drug-induced calcium phosphate crystals. Via examining the urinary sediments, calcium phosphate crystals are identified, and the associated phosphate nephropathy is determined.

As phosphate nephropathy results in acute kidney injury and chronic kidney disease, the impairment in kidney function can be measured via urinalysis. The presence of non-dysmorphic erythrocytes, modest proteinuria or protein within urine, pyuria or pus within urine, and leukocyte cast indicates acute tubular necrosis and acute tubulointerstitial nephritis.

For phosphate nephropathy with nonspecific symptoms, renal biopsy is reported as an important diagnosis due to the normal levels of both calcium and phosphorus. Following renal biopsy, the calcium phosphate crystals are distinguished from calcium oxalate crystals via staining with haematoxylin and eosin, as calcium phosphate deposits lack birefringence under polarized light. Then, the positive staining with the von Kossa stains can be used to display the presence of abnormal calcium and phosphate deposits respectively via light illumination.

== Prevention ==
As phosphate nephropathy is considered an irreversible complication when starting to progress into acute kidney injury and chronic kidney disease, prevention strategies can help to avoid the undesired outcomes. According to the FDA, it is recommended for both healthcare professionals and patients, particularly high-risk individuals, to obtain adequate information about the adverse effect of OSP before administering and consuming this agent. Monitoring of renal function weeks or months after the administration of OSP also helps to early detect and treat the condition appropriately.

Withholding the antihypertensive medications (ARBs, ACEIs), diuretic medications, and NSAIDs before and after the use of OSP for colonoscopy, is reported to minimize the risk of phosphate nephropathy.

As ingestion of OPS can potentially induce osmotic diarrhea and result in depletion of body fluid, adequate hydration is recommended before and after the procedure to prevent episodes of hypotension. It is unknown whether water or electrolyte-containing solutions would adequately compensate the electrolyte imbalance following the use of OSP. The recommended volume of fluid when using OSP as a bowel preparation agent varies from 0.7 to 2.2 L, with the optimal amount greater than 3.7 L. It is still unknown whether lowering the standard doses of OSP from 45/45 ml to 45/30 mL in 9–12 hours apart would be safer to use, as lower OSP dose was reported to cause moderate elevation of serum phosphorus.

In addition, there are other relevant bowel-preparation agents that can be used in line with the colonoscopy guidelines including electrolyte-based purgatives such as Golytely, Polyethylene glycol (PEG), sodium picosulfate, and sodium laxatives. These bowel preparation alternatives show the same efficacy with OSP and cause less frequently and significantly side effects and complications than OSP.

== Treatment ==
Upon the early detection, phosphate nephropathy can be treated with a timely renal replacement therapy such as haemodialysis or peritoneal dialysis in order to decelerate the calcium phosphate crystallization process. Haemodialysis is performed to assist the renal excretion via removing accumulated toxins, especially the overproduction of reactive oxygen species at the damaged tubular epithelial cells. The complete recovery of renal function after phosphate nephropathy progression to acute kidney injury or to chronic kidney disease, was reported to be rare.

== History ==
Mannitol and large volume of saline were first used as bowel preparation agents prior to colonoscopy. As the use of Mannitol causes the production of methane, hydrogen, and other flammable gases, it was reported to be associated with colonic explosion. Large volume of saline was also reported to significantly impact the electrolyte balance and net fluid within the body. Later in the 1990, the polyethylene-glycol electrolyte lavage solution or PEG-ELS, was formulated with more effectiveness and safety to use. PEG-ELS was not widely adopted due to its requirement of consuming an enormous volume. Then, OSP (C.B. Fleet's Phospho soda) in the form of tablets with the same efficacy as PEG-ELS, was chosen as a safe alternative bowel preparation agent.

Later, in 1975, acute kidney injury and potential chronic kidney disease were first found to be related to the ingestion of OSP. Then, in 2003, an adverse incident of calcium phosphate deposition within the renal tubules was first reported following the use of OSP. This was linked to the tubular injury and other renal complications as well as the emergence of the term "phosphate nephropathy".
