= Lightwood–Albright syndrome =

Lightwood-Albright syndrome
- Specialty: Urology

Lightwood–Albright syndrome is a neonatal form of renal tubular acidosis. It is characterized by distal renal tubular acidosis that occurs as a result of bicarbonate wasting and the inability to excrete hydrogen ions. By definition, it is a transient process and has no particular disease course. If untreated, it may lead to nephrocalcinosis and failure to thrive.

It is also known as Lightwood Syndrome, Butler-Albright Syndrome, or Lightwood-Butler-Albright Syndrome. It is named for Reginald Cyril Lightwood and Fuller Albright.

== Pathophysiology ==
There is a genetic component to inheritance. While the disease can manifest without an inciting factor, most diagnoses come from an autosomal dominant and (less commonly) autosomal recessive form of inheritance. Specific genes include the SLC4A1 on chromosome 17, ATP6V1B1 on chromosome 2, and ATP6V0A4 on chromosome 7. Published descriptions indicate that the transient Lightwood syndrome phenotype may include distal renal tubular acidosis, with or without bicarbonate wasting, as well as proximal renal tubular acidosis.

Nephrons are the functional cells of the kidney and are necessary for kidney reabsorption, secretion, and excretion. Mutations in the genes mentioned above contribute to a defect in nephrons.

In order for the nephron to remove acid (hydrogen ions) from the body, it must pair it with ammonia to produce ammonium. These mutations lead to the nephron's inability to pair the hydrogen ion with ammonia, preventing hydrogen ions from being excreted through the urine. This, along with the inability to excrete other acids in the body, contribute to metabolic acidosis and renal tubular acidosis.

== Diagnosis ==
Lightwood–Albright syndrome is diagnosed with a combination of laboratory and physical exam findings. Therefore, health care providers will look at electrolytes and serum acid-base levels to determine if Lightwood-Albright Syndrome is the proper diagnosis. Laboratory findings can include metabolic acidosis, hyperchloremia, hypercalcemia, and elevated urinary pH. Specifically, the urine will be unable to reach a pH under 5.5 because of its basicity. Clinical findings can include muscle wasting, vomiting, failure to thrive, fatigue, constipation, polyuria, and polydipsia.

The following are important differential diagnoses that should be considered by a medical provider before making the diagnosis.

- Periodic Paralysis
- Adenosine-Deaminase Deficiency
- Gitelman Syndrome
- Lowe Syndrome

== Treatment ==
Treatment of Lightwood–Albright syndrome is through transient alkali replacement therapy. This treatment option utilizes alkali as a base to help equilibrate the amount of extra acid, that is being retained in the body. Treatment may not be required as it is a self-limiting process and is often resolved on its own.

== Epidemiology ==
Lightwood–Albright syndrome affects neonates. Most neonates that are affected by the disease are male. It is possible that older children may have this disease, but with a different clinical picture that includes rickets, bone deformities, growth retardation, and pathological bone fractures.
