= Medullary sponge kidney =

Congenital disorder of urinary system

- Other names: Cacchi–Ricci disease
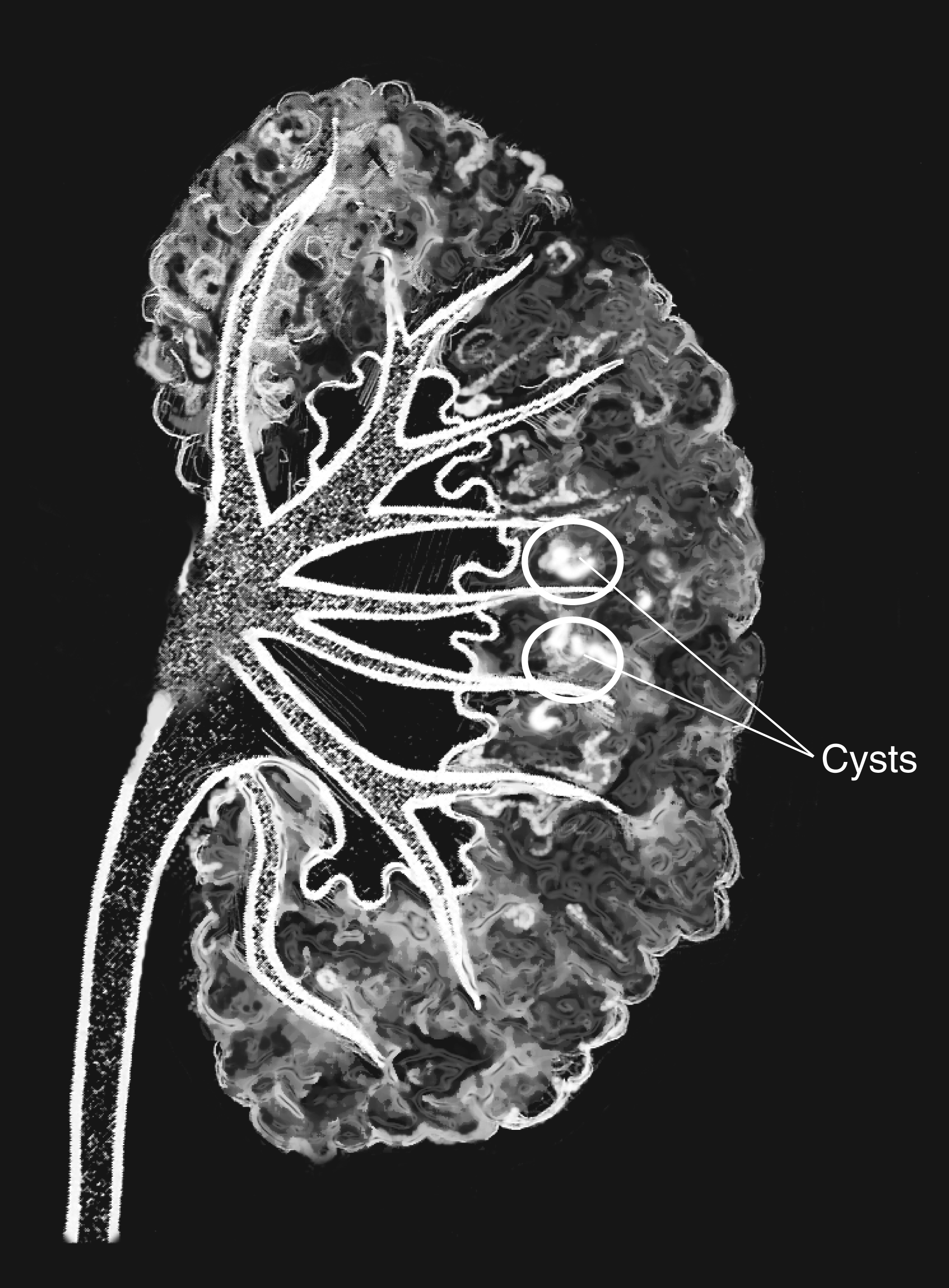
- Medullary sponge as seen on an intravenous pyelogram
- Specialty: Medical genetics, nephrology

Medullary sponge kidney is a congenital disorder of the kidneys characterized by cystic dilatation of the collecting tubules in one or both kidneys. Individuals with medullary sponge kidney are at increased risk for kidney stones and urinary tract infection (UTI). Patients with MSK typically pass twice as many stones per year as do other stone formers without MSK. While having a low morbidity rate, as many as 10% of patients with MSK have an increased risk of morbidity associated with frequent stones and UTIs. While many patients report increased chronic kidney pain, the source of the pain, when a UTI or blockage is not present, is unclear at this time. Renal colic (flank and back pain) is present in 55% of patients. Women with MSK experience more stones, UTIs, and complications than men. MSK was previously believed not to be hereditary but there is more evidence coming forth that may indicate otherwise.

== Signs and symptoms ==
Most cases are asymptomatic or are discovered during an investigation of blood in the urine. Symptomatic patients typically present as middle-aged adults with renal colic, kidney stones, nephrocalcinosis, and/or recurrent urinary tract infections; however, MSK also may affect children very rarely. In addition to the typical clinical phenotype of recurrent stone disease, other clinical profiles have now been recognized, that is, an indolent, almost asymptomatic MSK, and a rare form characterized by intractable pain.

=== Complications ===
Complications associated with medullary sponge kidney include the following:

- Kidney stones
- Urinary tract infection (UTI)
- Blood in the urine
- Distal renal tubular acidosis (Type 1 RTA)
- Chronic kidney disease (rarely)
- Marked chronic pain

== Cause ==
In recent studies, insight has been obtained on the genetic basis of this disease, supporting the hypothesis that MSK is due to a disruption at the 'ureteric bud-metanephric mesenchyme' interface. This explains why so many tubular defects coexist in this disease, and particularly a distal tubular acidification defect of which the highly prevalent metabolic bone disease is one very important consequence. In addition to the typical clinical phenotype of recurrent stone disease, other clinical profiles have now been recognized, that is, an indolent, almost asymptomatic MSK, and a rare form characterized by intractable, excruciating pain. It was previously believed that most cases of medullary sponge kidney were sporadic; however, recent studies show familial clustering of MSK is common and has an autosomal dominant inheritance, a reduced penetrance, and variable expressivity. Other theories suggest that dilatation of a collecting duct may occur, caused by occlusion by uric acid during fetal life or resulting from tubular obstruction due to calcium oxalate calculi secondary to infantile hypercalciuria.

A rare, autosomal recessive form is associated with Caroli disease.

== Diagnosis ==
Classically, MSK is seen as hyperechoic papillae with clusters of small stones on ultrasound examination of the kidney or with an abdominal x-ray. The irregular (ectatic) collecting ducts are often seen in MSK, which are sometimes described as having a "paintbrush-like" appearance, and are best seen on intravenous urography. However, IV urography has been largely replaced by contrast-enhanced, high-resolution helical CT with digital reconstruction. Intraoperative digital endoscopy can also aid in diagnosis by revealing characteristic billowy papillae and freely mobile stones within the inner medullary collecting ducts.

== Treatment ==
Often, aggressive treatment is unnecessary for people with MSK disease that does not cause any symptoms (asymptomatic). In such cases, treatment may consist of maintaining adequate fluid intake, with the goal of decreasing the risk of developing kidney stones (nephrolithiasis). Cases of recurrent kidney stone formation may warrant evaluation for possible underlying metabolic abnormalities.

In patients with low levels of citrate in the urine (hypocitraturia) and incomplete distal renal tubular acidosis, treatment with potassium citrate helps prevent the formation of new kidney stones. Urinary tract infections, when they occur, should also be treated.

Patients with the more rare form of MSK marked by chronic pain typically require pain management. Non-obstructing stones in MSK can be associated with significant and chronic pain even if they're not passing. It is not certain what causes this pain, but researchers have proposed that the small numerous stones seen in MSK may cause obstruction of the small tubules and collecting ducts in the kidney. This pain can be constant, can often be debilitating and treatment is challenging. Narcotic medication, even in large quantities, is sometimes not adequate. Some success with pain control has been reported using laser lithotripsy (called "ureteroscopic laser papillotomy").

== Epidemiology ==
In the general population, the frequency of medullary sponge kidney disease is reported to be 0.02–0.005%; that is, 1 in 5000 to 1 in 20,000. The frequency of medullary sponge kidney has been reported by various authors to be 12–21% in patients with kidney stones. The disease is bilateral in 70% of cases.
