= Potassium citrate/potassium hydrogen carbonate =

Pharmaceutical drug

Combination of
- Potassium citrate: Mineral supplement
- Potassium hydrogen carbonate: Mineral supplement

Clinical data
- Trade names: Sibnayal
- Other names: ADV7103, potassium citrate/potassium hydrogencarbonate, potassium citrate/potassium bicarbonate
- Routes of administration: By mouth
- ATC code: A12BA30 (WHO)

Legal status
- Legal status: EU: Rx-only

Potassium citrate/potassium hydrogen carbonate, sold under the brand name Sibnayal, is a fixed-dose combination medication intended for the treatment of distal renal tubular acidosis. It contains potassium citrate and potassium hydrogen carbonate.

Potassium citrate/potassium hydrogen carbonate was approved for medical use in the European Union in April 2021.

== Medical uses ==
Potassium citrate/potassium hydrogen carbonate is indicated for the treatment of distal renal tubular acidosis (dRTA) in people aged one year and older.

== Society and culture ==
=== Legal status ===
In December 2020, the Committee for Medicinal Products for Human Use (CHMP) of the European Medicines Agency (EMA) adopted a positive opinion, recommending the granting of a marketing authorization for the medicinal product Sibnayal. The applicant for this medicinal product is Advicenne S.A. Potassium citrate/potassium hydrogen carbonate was approved for medical use in the European Union in April 2021.

Potassium citrate/potassium hydrogen carbonate is recommended for approval in the United Kingdom.

== Research ==
Potassium citrate/potassium hydrogen carbonate is undergoing phase III trials in preparation for evaluation by the US Food and Drug Administration (FDA).
