= Alwin Max Pappenheimer Jr. =

American biochemist and immunologist

Alwin Max Pappenheimer Jr. (November 25, 1908 – March 21, 1995) was an American biochemist and immunologist.

Pappenheimer was noted for his advances in the field of bacterial toxins and in particular for isolation and analysis of the diphtheria toxin for which he received Eli Lilly Award in 1941. He performed ultracentrifugation-based analysis of diphtheria toxin-antitoxin interactions with Mary Locke Petermann and John Warren Williams at the University of Wisconsin.

Pappenheimer was professor of biology at Harvard University, professor of bacteriology and immunology at New York University, master of Dunster House, a member of the National Academy of Sciences, a member of the American Academy of Arts and Sciences, president of the American Association of Immunologists. He received the 1941 Eli Lilly and Company-Elanco Research Award and the 1990 Paul Ehrlich Prize and Gold Medal.

== Life and career ==
Pappenheimer was born in Cedarhurst, New York. He was the eldest son of Dr. Alwin Max Pappenheimer, a distinguished pathologist on the faculty of the College of Physicians and Surgeons at Columbia University. His brother John Pappenheimer later became a professor of physiology at Harvard University, and his sister Anne Pappenheimer Forbes became an endocrinologist and clinical professor at Harvard Medical School.

Pappenheimer Jr. received his Ph.D. in organic chemistry from Harvard University in 1932. He joined Harvard in 1958 as chairman of the Board of Tutors in Biochemical Sciences.
