= Renal cortical necrosis =

- Other names: Diffuse bilateral renal cortical necrosis (BRCN), diffuse cortical necrosis, acute cortical necrosis, acute kidney failure with acute cortical necrosis
- Specialty: Nephrology

Renal cortical necrosis (RCN) is a rare cause of acute kidney failure. The condition is "usually caused by significantly diminished arterial perfusion of the kidneys due to spasms of the feeding arteries, microvascular injury, or disseminated intravascular coagulation" and is the pathological progression of acute tubular necrosis. It is frequently associated with obstetric catastrophes such as abruptio placentae and septic shock, and is three times more common in developing nations versus industrialized nations (2% versus 6% in causes of acute kidney failure).

== Causes ==
=== Adults ===
- Pregnancy related (>50% of cases)
  - Placental abruption
  - Infected abortion
  - Prolonged intrauterine fetal death
  - Severe eclampsia
- HIV
- Snake bites
- Binge drinking
- Shock
- Trauma
- Sickle cell disease
- Systemic lupus erythematosus (SLE)
- Sepsis
- SLE-associated antiphospholipid syndrome
- Vitamin deficiency
- Pancreatitis
- Malaria
- Meningococcemia
- Drug-induced toxicity (e.g. NSAIDs, Contrast Media, Quinine, or ATRA)

=== Babies ===
- Congenital heart disease
- Fetal-maternal transfusion
- Dehydration
- Perinatal asphyxia
- Anemia
- Placental hemorrhage
- Severe hemolytic disease
- Sepsis

== Pathophysiology ==
The exact pathologic mechanism for RCN is unclear, however the onset of small vessel pathology is likely an important aspect in the cause of this condition. In general the renal cortex is under greater oxygen tension and more prone to ischemic injury, especially at the level of the proximal collecting tubule, leading to its preferential damage in a sudden drop in perfusion. Rapidly corrected acute renal ischemia leads to acute tubular necrosis, from which complete recovery is possible, while more prolonged ischemia may lead to RCN. Pathologically, the cortex of the kidney is grossly atrophied with relative preservation of the gross structure of the medulla. The damage is usually bilateral owing to its underlying systemic causes, and is most frequently associated with pregnancy (>50% of cases). It accounts for 2% of all cases of acute kidney failure in adults and more than 20% of cases of acute kidney failure during late pregnancy.

== Diagnosis ==
While the only diagnostic "gold standard" mechanism of diagnosis en vivo is via kidney biopsy, the clinical conditions and blood clotting disorder often associated with this disease may make it impractical in a clinical setting. Alternatively, it is diagnosed clinically, or at autopsy, with some authors suggesting diagnosis by contrast enhanced CT.

== Treatment ==
Patients will require dialysis to compensate for the function of their kidneys.

== Prognosis ==
Cortical necrosis is a severe and life-threatening condition, with mortality rates over 50%. Those mortality rates are even higher in neonates with the condition due to the overall difficult nature of neonatal care and an increased frequency of comorbid conditions. The extent of the necrosis is a major determinant of the prognosis, which in turn is dependent on the duration of ischemia, duration of oliguria, and the severity of the precipitating conditions. Of those that survive the initial event, there are varying degrees of recovery possible, depending on the extent of the damage.
