= Charles Enrique Dent =

British professor of human metabolism

Charles Enrique Dent, CBE, FRCP, FRS (25 August 1911 – 19 September 1976) was a British professor of human metabolism at University College, London. After studying chemistry at Imperial College London, he gained a PhD for his work on copper phthalocyanine, then worked for ICI Dyestuffs Group in Manchester and also studied secret writing, which he later made use of during the Second World War.

He completed his medical studies in 1944. The following year, he was sent by the Medical Research Council to the recently liberated concentration camp at Belsen together with Janet Vaughan and Rosalind Pitt-Rivers, to study if starvation could be treated with protein hydrolysates.

From 1946, his career focused on several inborn errors of metabolism. He was appointed a Commander of the Order of the British Empire in the 1976 New Year Honours

== Early life ==
He was born in Burgos, Spain, son of Leeds-born Frankland Dent, a chemist, and his Spanish wife Carmen de Mira y Perceval, who met while his father was working in Spain. The parents married in 1903 and soon afterwards his father was appointed government chemist in Singapore. Their first two children were born in Singapore, but his mother went home to Spain for the birth of Charles. At the outbreak of World War I in 1914, the family left Singapore and ended up in Bedford, where Charles was educated at Bedford School before moving on to Wimbledon College.

== Career ==
In 1927 Charles left school to work in a bank, but soon moved to work as a laboratory technician and study at evening classes at Regent Street Polytechnic. In 1930 he entered Imperial College London to study chemistry and graduated BSc. In 1934 he was awarded a PhD for his work on copper phthalocyanine (later marketed by ICI as 'Monastral blue') and went to work for ICI Dyestuffs Group in Manchester. Convinced that a war would soon come, and wondering how a chemist could contribute to the war effort, he also began around this time to study secret writing and became something of an expert in this field even before the war.

In 1937 he entered University College, London as a medical student. When World War II broke out in 1939, he was sent to France as part of the British Expeditionary Force, attached to intelligence and in charge of a small mobile laboratory and an assistant to look for secret writing in Army mail. When the Expeditionary Force began to retreat towards Dunkirk, he became a dispatch rider assigned a small car. He was one of the last to arrive in Dunkirk for the evacuation, driving a general there under frequent attacks from German planes.

At the end of 1940 he was called up again and was sent to Bermuda, where he was put in charge of an organisation specialising in secret writing. While there, he met his future wife, Margaret Ruth Coad, who was also working in intelligence. After two years in Bermuda, he was sent to the United States to help the Americans set up their own laboratories for detecting secret writing.

In 1944 he completed his medical course and became house officer to Sir Thomas Lewis at University College. He was also appointed assistant to the Medical Unit of University College Hospital Medical School under Professor Harold Himsworth. The same year he married Margaret Coad.

In April 1945 he was sent by the Medical Research Council to the recently liberated concentration camp at Belsen together with Janet Vaughan and Rosalind Pitt-Rivers, to study if starvation could be treated with protein hydrolysates (i.e. amino-acid mixtures).

In 1946–47 he studied in Rochester, New York on a Rockefeller scholarship, initially in the field of amino-acid metabolism. He was a pioneer in the field of partition chromatography for the study of biological fluids and developed methods of random testing for metabolic disorders. He also defined new amino-acid diseases such as various forms of Fanconi syndrome, Hartnup disease, argininosuccinic aciduria and homocystinuria.

He began research into a hereditary disease of the kidneys which was greatly expanded by his pupil Oliver Wrong and named Dent's disease.

In 1949 he awarded MD and in 1951 persuaded University College Hospital to establish a metabolic ward with beds, laboratories and outpatient clinics. He was appointed Reader in medicine. His research interests broadened to include the study of clinical disorders of calcium and phosphorus metabolism, vitamin D deficiency and the action of parathyroid, increasing the emphasis on the clinical side of his work, rather than laboratory science. In 1956 he was appointed Professor of Human Metabolism at UCH.

== Honours ==
In 1954 he was elected a Fellow of the Royal College of Physicians and in 1962 elected a Fellow of the Royal Society. Dent was appointed a Commander of the Order of the British Empire in the 1976 New Year Honours.

== Death and legacy ==
He died of leukaemia in 1976. He had married Margaret Ruth Coad in 1944; they had six children, among them Emma Dent Coad MP. Dent was a believing Catholic who applied Church teaching to his clinical work and saw no conflict between science and religion.
