= Mary Locke Petermann =

American cellular biochemist

- Born: February 25, 1908; Laurium, Michigan, U.S.
- Died: December 13, 1975 (aged 67); Philadelphia, Pennsylvania, U.S.
- Education: Smith College; A.B. in chemistry (1929); University of Wisconsin; Ph.D in physiological chemistry (1939)
- Known for: isolation and characterization of ribosomes
- Awards: Sloan Award for cancer research (1963); Garvan Medal from American Cancer Society (1966)
- Scientific career
- Fields: biochemistry
- Workplaces: Memorial Sloan Kettering; Cornell University Medical School

Mary Locke Petermann (February 25, 1908 – December 13, 1975) was an American cellular biochemist known for her key role in the discovery and characterization of animal ribosomes, the molecular complexes that carry out protein synthesis. She was the first woman to become a full professor at Cornell University's medical school.

== Early life and education ==
Mary Petermann was born February 25, 1908, in Laurium, Michigan, to Anna Mae Grierson and Albert Edward Petermann, general manager of the Calumet and Hecla Consolidated Copper Company in Calumet, Michigan.

She attended Calumet High School and Massachusetts preparatory school, then graduated from Smith College in 1929 with high honors in chemistry. She then took a break from schooling, spending a year working at Yale University as a research technician, followed by four years researching acid-base imbalance in psychiatric patients at the Boston Psychopathic Hospital. She began doctoral studies in physiological chemistry at the University of Wisconsin in 1936. In 1939, she graduated with a Ph.D for thesis work on the role of the adrenal cortex in ion regulation.

== Career ==
After receiving her doctorate, she stayed on at the University of Wisconsin. She became their physical chemistry department's first female chemist staff member and remained there as a postdoctoral researcher until 1945. At Wisconsin, she performed research on the physical chemistry of proteins with John Warren Williams and Alwin M. Pappenheimer, including analysis of antibody-antigen interactions, in particular those between diphtheria toxin and antitoxin. Using ultracentrifugation, they showed that about 2/3 of the native diphtheria antitoxin (later determined to be the Fc portion of IgG) was "inactive" - it could be removed by protease treatment and the antitoxin could still bind two antigen molecules, so the binding sites must be close together. Her research on antibodies contributed to Rodney Porter's determination of immunoglobulin structure, for which he received the 1972 Nobel Prize. She also studied human serum albumin for the National Defense Research Council's Committee on Medical Research during World War II, developing ways to purify albumin for use as a blood substitute.

In 1945, she took a position as a chemist at Memorial Hospital in New York City, studying the role of plasma proteins in metastasis then went on to research the role of nucleoproteins in cancer at the newly-formed Sloan-Kettering Institute for cancer research in 1946. Initially a Finney-Howell Foundation fellow, she was promoted to an associate member in 1960 and a full member in 1963, Sloan-Kettering Institute's first female full member.

While at Sloan-Kettering, she also taught biochemistry at Cornell University's Sloan-Kettering Division of the Graduate School of Medical Sciences and became Cornell's first female full professor.

She received the Sloan Award for cancer research in 1963 and used the prize money to travel to Europe to perform lectures and work in the laboratory of Nobel laureate Arne Tiselius. In 1966, the American Chemical Society awarded her the Garvan Medal, a national honor given to women who have made exemplary contributions to chemistry.

She authored around 100 papers as well as a book, The Physical and Chemical Properties of Ribosomes (1964).

She retired from Cornell in 1973, then founded and served as the first president of the Memorial Sloan Kettering Cancer Association for Professional Women.

== Research on the ribosome ==
Petermann was the first person to isolate animal ribosomes, the sites of protein synthesis. In earlier work using cell fractionation to investigate the content of animal cells, Albert Claude found a pool of particles containing nucleic acids and proteins he termed "microsomes." Petermann found that these particles contained roughly equal amounts of RNA and protein but varied greatly in size. To purify the components further, she used a technique called analytical ultracentrifugation to separate components of mouse spleen and liver homogenates based on their relative sedimentation velocity (related to their size).

Later, electron microscopy by Philip Siekevitz and George Palade would show that the original "microsomes" were fragments of the endoplasmic reticulum, studded with ribosomes. Petermann had been able to isolate pure ribosomes because the high centrifugation velocities she used to sediment molecules in a high-density sugar solution spun off fragments of the endoplasmic reticulum. The small particles she isolated were named "Petermann's particles" before being formally named "ribosomes" at a Biophysical Society meeting in 1958. In addition to isolating ribosomes, she worked with Mary Hamilton to characterize their physical and chemical properties.

== Later life ==
Petermann never married or had children. She died of cancer December 13, 1975, at the age of 67, at Philadelphia's American Oncologic Hospital. In 1976, the Educational Foundation of the Association for Women in Science named a graduate scholarship in her honor.

== Honors and awards ==
- Sloan Award for cancer research, 1963
- Garvan Medal, American Chemical Society, 1966
- Honorary doctorate, Smith College
- Distinguished Service Award, American Academy of Achievement
- Rockefeller Foundation fellowship
- Elected fellow of the New York Academy of Sciences
- Michigan Women's Hall of Fame, 2022

== Key papers ==
- Petermann, Mary L.; Hamilton, Mary G. (May 1, 1952). "An Ultracentrifugal Analysis of the Macromolecular Particles of Normal and Leukemic Mouse Spleen". Cancer Research. 12 (5): 373–378. ISSN 0008-5472. PMID 14925948.
- Petermann, M. L.; Pappenheimer, A. M. (January 1941). "The Ultracentrifugal Analysis of Diphtheria Proteins". The Journal of Physical Chemistry. 45 (1): 1–9. doi:10.1021/j150406a001. ISSN 0092-7325.
