= Fuller Albright =

American endocrinologist (1900–1969)

- Born: January 12, 1900; Buffalo, New York, U.S.
- Died: December 8, 1969 (aged 69); Boston, Massachusetts, U.S.
- Education: Harvard College; Harvard Medical School; Johns Hopkins School of Medicine
- Occupation: Endocrinologist
- Known for: Calcium metabolism
- Spouse: Claire Birge (m. 1932)
- Children: Read Albright; Birge Albright
- Parent(s): John J. Albright; Susan Fuller

Fuller Albright (January 12, 1900 – December 8, 1969) was an American endocrinologist who made numerous contributions to his field, especially to the area of calcium metabolism. Albright made great strides and contributions to the understanding of disorders associated with calcium and phosphate abnormalities in the body. He also was a published author and in his books he detailed his findings.

== Early life ==
Albright was born on January 12, 1900, in Buffalo, New York. He was the third child of John J. Albright, a prominent businessman and philanthropist who constructed the Albright Art Gallery in Buffalo, and Susan Fuller, a Smith College graduate who was Albright's second wife. Albright had three children from his first marriage and six from his marriage to Fuller. His maternal grandparents were Eben and Nancy Fuller, of Lancaster, Massachusetts. His paternal grandparents were Joseph Jacob and Elizabeth S. Albright, both from Pennsylvania.

The family was descended from Andrew Albright, a gunsmith who supplied arms to the troops of the Continental Army during the Revolutionary War, who had come to America in 1750. Joseph was a coal agent for Delaware and Hudson Canal Company and the Delaware, Lackawanna and Western Railroad and eventually, President of the First National Bank.

=== Education ===
Albright entered Harvard College at age of seventeen. After graduating cum laude three years later, he entered Harvard Medical School in the fall of 1920. While he initially took an interest in obstetrics and orthopedic surgery, the discovery of insulin attracted him to internal medicine, specifically the study of metabolism. After his internship at Massachusetts General Hospital he embarked on a one-year programme of research with Joseph Charles Aub, mainly into calcium metabolism and lead poisoning.

He was subsequently assistant resident to Warfield Longcope at Johns Hopkins Hospital and Johns Hopkins School of Medicine in Baltimore, where he performed numerous experiments often without realizing their significance together with his friend John Eager Howard. He then spent a year in Vienna with pathologist Jakob Erdheim.

== Career ==
In the early 1930s he returned to Boston, where he became a member of the staff of Massachusetts General Hospital (MGH). At MGH, he rapidly developed an endocrinology research group. In 1939, he began a longtime research collaboration with Anne Pappenheimer Forbes.

Albright is credited with numerous discoveries in medicine. He described polyostotic fibrous dysplasia (a version of this disease with an endocrine component was later eponymically called McCune–Albright syndrome), the clinical and pathological features and different types of hyperparathyroidism (excessive production of parathyroid hormone by the parathyroid glands), the mechanism of Cushing's syndrome, and renal tubular acidosis (inability of the kidneys to regulate the acid-base balance in the body), and recognized the importance of menopause on osteoporosis. He also delineated forms of congenital adrenal hyperplasia. Known for Lightwood–Albright syndrome, a neonatal form of renal tubular acidosis.

=== Appointments and honors ===
In 1941 Albright was elected a Fellow of the American Academy of Arts and Sciences. He was the president of the American Society for Clinical Investigation (1943–1944), the Association for the Study of Internal Secretions (1945–1946) and the Endocrine Society (1946–1947). In 1955 he was elected to the National Academy of the Sciences.

Since 1981, the American Society for Bone and Mineral Research has every year given the Fuller Albright Award in recognition of meritorious scientific accomplishment in the field of bone and mineral research.

- Roche-Organnon Award in Endocrinology (1947)
- American College of Physicians Award for Achievement in Internal Medicine (1947)
- Borden Award, Association of American Medical Colleges, for "extraordinarily original and monumental contributions to the understanding of metabolism of bone and other tissues." (1949)
- The Joseph Goldberger Award of the American Medical Association's Council on Foods and Nutrition (1951)
- Doctorate of Science, Harvard University (1955)
- Citation, Massachusetts General Hospital, for being one of the 15 outstanding physicians who had received early training at the hospital (1961)

== Personal life ==
In 1930, he met Claire Birge (1906-1990) of Greenwich, Connecticut, daughter of Walter William Birge and Mabelle Clair Brown, and by 1933, they were married. As a wedding present, Albright's father bought them a house in Brookline, Massachusetts next door to conductor Serge Koussevitzky. Together, they had two sons:

- Read Albright (1939-2011), who married Jo Anne Pierson
- Birge Albright, (1935-2023) who married Carol Bonomo (b. 1938), an author

Albright developed Parkinson's disease in 1937. By 1956 his symptoms were so intractable that he underwent experimental brain surgery, chemical pallidotomy (obliteration of the globus pallidus by injection of alcohol). The intervention on the right was a success, but the left-sided procedure was complicated by haemorrhage, which left him aphasic and comatose for the remaining 13 years of his life, during which he was nursed at Massachusetts General Hospital. (Later, Claire married Richard Horace Bassett (1900-1995), an artist and writer.)

== Death and legacy ==
Albright died on 8 December 1969. The Albright's dimple sign is named for him.
