= Anne Pappenheimer Forbes =

American endocrinologist

- Born: November 11, 1911; New York City
- Died: February 25, 1992 (aged 80); Milton, Massachusetts
- Scientific career
- Fields: Endocrinology
- Institutions: Massachusetts General Hospital; Harvard Medical School

Anne Pappenheimer Forbes (1911–1992) was an American endocrinologist. A graduate of Radcliffe College and Columbia College of Physicians and Surgeons, she was an associate of Fuller Albright, who was the endocrinology chief at Harvard Medical School and Massachusetts General Hospital (MGH). Forbes was one of the first women to reach the rank of clinical professor at Harvard Medical School.

Forbes opened the Ovarian Dysfunction Clinic at MGH, and she took on much of the administrative responsibility for Albright's research studies beginning in the late 1930s, when he was diagnosed with Parkinson's disease. She practiced medicine until 1980. Forbes-Albright syndrome is partly named for her.

== Early life ==
Forbes was born Anne Pappenheimer in New York City on November 11, 1911. Her father, Alwin Max Pappenheimer, was a physician and professor of pathology at Columbia College of Physicians and Surgeons. Two brothers, John Pappenheimer and Alwin Max Pappenheimer Jr., became science professors at Harvard University. Forbes attended the Lincoln School in New York, where she had diverse extracurricular involvement. She was a writer for the school newspaper, learned to farm, and rode horses. At the Lincoln School she identified that she wanted to be a farmer or a doctor. She entered Radcliffe College at the age of 16.

In 1931, with Forbes headed into her senior year at Radcliffe, her parents took her on a trip through several countries, including Russia and China. She was away from her studies for several months, and had to make up the time in summer school. Part of her summer work involved biochemistry studies at the Marine Biological Laboratory at Woods Hole. She was granted an undergraduate degree in 1933, after she completed her first year of medical school at Columbia.

== Career ==
Forbes graduated from medical school in 1936. She spent the next two years as an intern at Johns Hopkins Hospital. Forbes began at MGH in 1939 as an unpaid observer. Once World War II got underway, many male physicians were called to active duty and Forbes formally became a colleague of Albright. She opened the Ovarian Dysfunction Clinic at MGH. When Forbes took the formal position at MGH, she assumed the administrative responsibilities for Albright's research studies, as he had been diagnosed with Parkinson's disease. They worked together until 1956, when Albright experienced complications after a brain surgery intended to treat his disease. Albright remained in a vegetative state until he died in 1969.

As one of the first women to become a clinical professor at Harvard Medical School, Forbes balanced her work responsibilities with her family life. She married William Hathaway Forbes in 1935 and they had five children, including historian Beatrice Forbes Manz.

== Later life ==
Forbes retired in 1980, and she spent much of her time taking care of her garden and raising ponies and sheep. Forbes learned to shear the sheep and to spin and dye the wool herself. She was a caretaker for her husband while he suffered from dementia, and she helped to care for her grandchildren while their mothers worked. She died in 1992, before her husband, of Hodgkin lymphoma.

Forbes-Albright syndrome was the name given to amenorrhea and galactorrhea occurring in the presence of a pituitary tumor. Forbes was one of the first women elected to membership in the American Society for Clinical Investigation. In a Harvard Medical School memorial, her colleagues referred to her as "endocrinology growth factor" for her ability to mentor young physicians in that specialty.
