= Will Pappenheimer =

American multi-media artist

Will Pappenheimer is an American multi-media artist and a founding member of the artist collective Manifest.AR. The son of Harvard University physiology professor John Pappenheimer (1915–2007) he received his under graduate degree from Harvard and then did his graduate studies at the School of the Museum of Fine Arts, Boston, where he received his MFA. His work was featured in the 2011 edition of "Lights on Tampa" the jury for which included Dave Hickey and Jerry Saltz. Pappenheimer is an associate professor at Pace University in New York City. in 2008 he was given a traveling road scholar grant awarded to alumni of the museum school which he used to create a piece on the mating pattern of the golden bowerbird a species native to the rainforests in the Tablelands of Queensland, Australia. The work from this endeavor was then shown in a subsequent exhibition at the Boston Museum of Fine Arts.

On November 19, 2014 the Whitney Museum of American Art said goodbye to their Marcel Breuer Madison Avenue home with a final commissioned work in the form of a Pappenheimer Whitney themed digital drug trip piece entitled "Proxy, 5-WM2A" and announced the opening of their new space by Renzo Piano in Manhattan's Meatpacking District adjoining the High Line on May 1, 2015.
