= Electrogenic sodium bicarbonate cotransporter 1 =

Protein-coding gene in the species Homo sapiens

SLC4A4

Identifiers
- Aliases: SLC4A4, HNBC1, KNBC, NBC1, NBC2, NBCe1-A, SLC4A5, hhNMC, pNBC, kNBC1, solute carrier family 4 member 4
- External IDs: OMIM: 603345; MGI: 1927555; GeneCards: SLC4A4

Gene location (Human)
Chr.	Chromosome 4 (human)
Band	4q13.3	Start	71,186,757 bp
Band	4q13.3	End	71,572,087 bp

Gene location (Mouse)
Chr.	Chromosome 5 (mouse)
Band	5|5 E1	Start	89,034,345 bp
Band	5|5 E1	End	89,387,512 bp
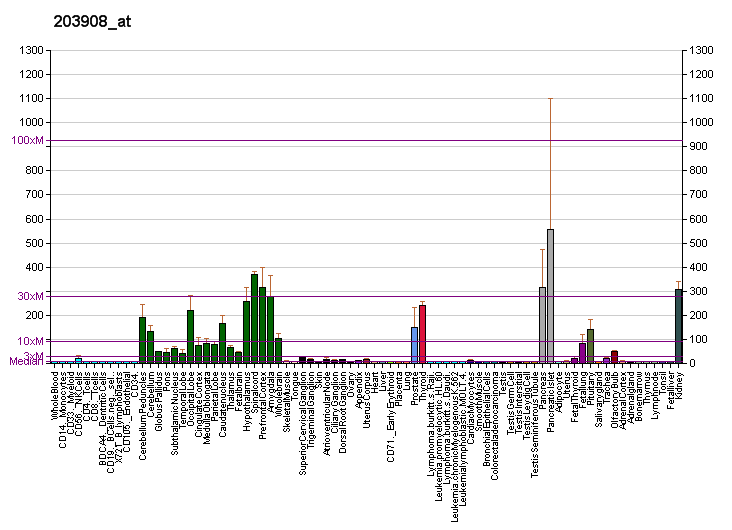

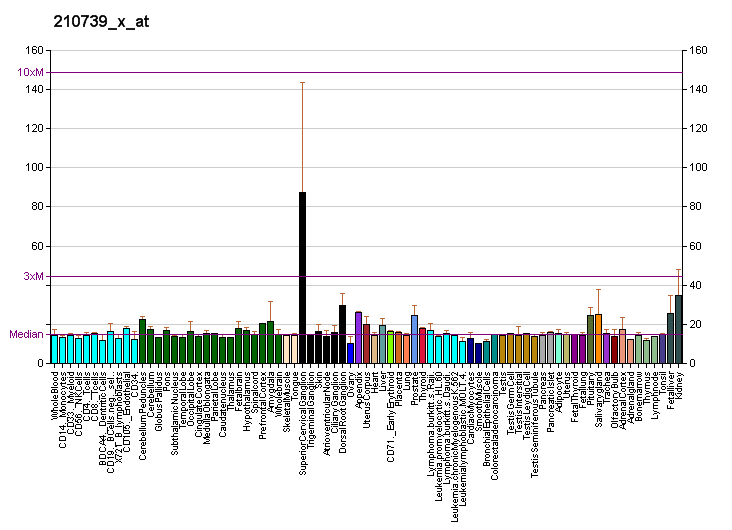

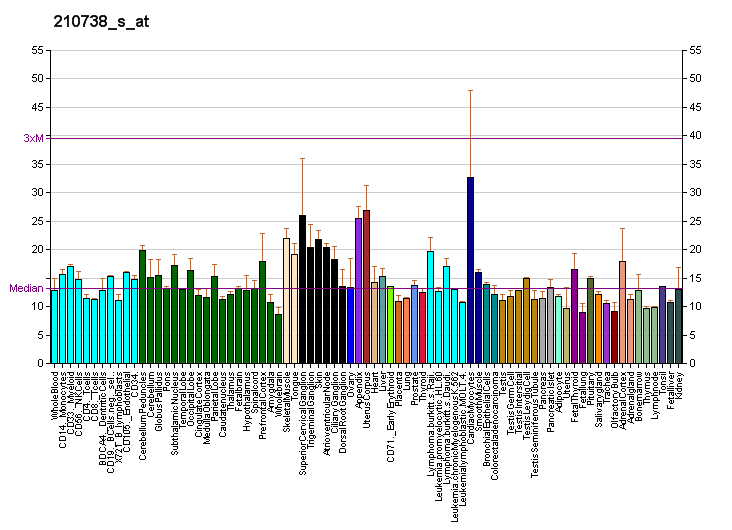
RNA expression pattern
Bgee	Human / Mouse (ortholog); Top expressed in: jejunal mucosa; external globus pallidus; mucosa of sigmoid colon; pancreatic ductal cell; internal globus pallidus; kidney tubule; body of pancreas; dorsal motor nucleus of vagus nerve; duodenum; bronchial epithelial cell / Top expressed in: ciliary body; cerebellar vermis; deep cerebellar nuclei; human kidney; lobe of cerebellum; globus pallidus; dorsal tegmental nucleus; right kidney; medial vestibular nucleus; iris; More reference expression data
BioGPS	More reference expression data
Gene ontology
Molecular function	transporter activity; anion transmembrane transporter activity; protein binding; symporter activity; inorganic anion exchanger activity; sodium:bicarbonate symporter activity; identical protein binding
Cellular component	integral component of membrane; plasma membrane; basolateral plasma membrane; integral component of plasma membrane; extracellular exosome; membrane
Biological process	bicarbonate transport; anion transmembrane transport; anion transport; sodium ion transport; sodium ion transmembrane transport; ion transport; inorganic anion transport; regulation of intracellular pH; transmembrane transport; transport
Sources:Amigo / QuickGO
Orthologs
Databases	NCBI: entry; OMA: entry
Species	Human	Mouse
Entrez	8671	54403
Ensembl	ENSG00000080493	ENSMUSG00000060961
UniProt	Q9Y6R1	O88343
RefSeq (mRNA)	NM_001098484; NM_001134742; NM_003759	NM_001136260; NM_001197147; NM_018760; NM_001359211; NM_001359212 NM_001359213
RefSeq (protein)	NP_001091954; NP_001128214; NP_003750	NP_001129732; NP_001184076; NP_061230; NP_001346140; NP_001346141 NP_001346142
Location (UCSC)	Chr 4: 71.19 – 71.57 Mb	Chr 5: 89.03 – 89.39 Mb
PubMed search
- Wikidata
View/Edit Human	View/Edit Mouse

Electrogenic sodium bicarbonate cotransporter 1, sodium bicarbonate cotransporter is a membrane transport protein that in humans is encoded by the SLC4A4 gene.

== Function ==
Sodium bicarbonate cotransporters (NBCs) mediate the coupled movement of sodium and bicarbonate ions across the plasma membrane of many cells. This is an electrogenic process with an apparent stoichiometry of 3 bicarbonate ions per sodium ion. Sodium bicarbonate co-transport is involved in bicarbonate secretion/absorption and intracellular pH regulation. Romero and Boron (1999) reviewed NBCs. Soleimani and Burnham (2000) reviewed NBCs and their regulation in physiologic and pathophysiologic states.[supplied by OMIM]

== Clinical significance ==
In the brain, the sodium bicarbonate transporter is predominantly expressed by astrocytes. They may participate in regulation of brain extracellular space pH. Some mutations in the gene have been associated with familial hemiplegic migraine. Other mutations disrupt kidney bicarbonate transport and cause proximal renal tubular acidosis.

== Splice variants ==
NBCe1-A aka kNBC1 (mainly expressed in the kidney)

NBCe1-B aka pNBC1 (expressed in the pancreas and elsewhere)

NBCe1-C (expressed in the brain)

== Distribution ==
The renal SLC4A4 gene product NBCe1-A is specifically expressed in the basolateral membranes of proximal tubule epithelia.

== See also ==
- Solute carrier family
