= John Pappenheimer =

- Born: October 25, 1915
- Died: December 26, 2007 (aged 92)
- Spouse: Helena Palmer
- Children: Three sons, including Will Pappenheimer, and one daughter
- Relatives: Alwin Max Pappenheimer, Jr. (brother), Anne Pappenheimer Forbes (sister)
- Scientific career
- Fields: Physiology
- Institutions: Harvard University

John Richard Pappenheimer (October 25, 1915 – December 26, 2007) was the George Higginson Professor of Physiology at Harvard University and the thirty-seventh president of the American Physiological Society from 1964 until 1965.

He contributed to a wide range of disciplines within physiology: capillary permeability, respiratory physiology, blood-brain-CSF transport, the neurochemical aspects of sleep, and most recently to the understanding of the absorption of sugars and amino acids in the intestine.

He was the youngest of three children born to Alwin Max Pappenheimer, Sr., a distinguished pathologist on the faculty of the College of Physicians and Surgeons at Columbia University and Beatrice (Leo) Pappenheimer. His siblings were Alwin Max Pappenheimer, Jr. (1908–1995) and Anne Pappenheimer Forbes (1911–1992). He married Helena Palmer in 1949, and they had three sons, Glenn, a poet and teacher 1954-1981, Will Pappenheimer, an artist, and Rick Plant, a musician, and one daughter, Rosamond Pappenheimer Zimmermann (Ros Zimmermann), an artist and poet.
