= OCRL =

Protein-coding gene in the species Homo sapiens

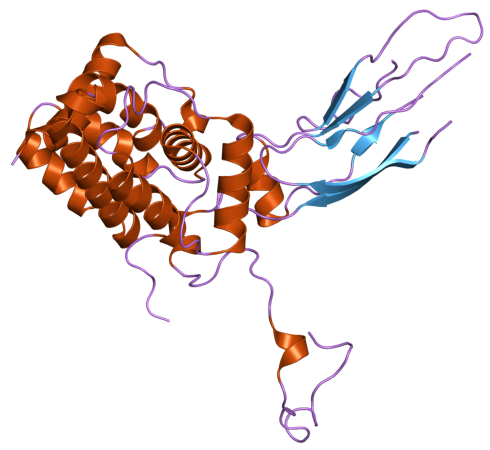

Identifiers
- Aliases: OCRL, LOCR, NPHL2, OCRL-1, OCRL1, oculocerebrorenal syndrome of Lowe, inositol polyphosphate-5-phosphatase, OCRL inositol polyphosphate-5-phosphatase, INPP5F, Dent-2, DENT2
- External IDs: OMIM: 300535; MGI: 109589; GeneCards: OCRL
Available structures
PDB	Ortholog search: PDBe RCSB
PDB	List of PDB id codes 4CMN, 2KIE, 2QV2, 3QBT, 3QIS
Enzyme activity
EC #	BRENDA	ExPASy	KEGG	MetaCyc
3.1.3.36	↗	↗	↗	↗
3.1.3.56	↗	↗	↗	↗
3.1.3.86	↗	↗	↗	↗

Gene location (Human)
Chr.	X chromosome (human)
Band	Xq26.1	Start	129,539,849 bp
Band	Xq26.1	End	129,592,561 bp

Gene location (Mouse)
Chr.	X chromosome (mouse)
Band	X|X A5	Start	47,912,387 bp
Band	X|X A5	End	47,965,868 bp
RNA expression pattern
Bgee	Human / Mouse (ortholog); Top expressed in: Brodmann area 10; gastric mucosa; frontal pole; islet of Langerhans; left ovary; right adrenal cortex; anterior pituitary; left adrenal gland; left adrenal cortex; right testis / Top expressed in: otolith organ; utricle; tail of embryo; primary visual cortex; superior frontal gyrus; muscle of thigh; dentate gyrus of hippocampal formation granule cell; ventromedial nucleus; genital tubercle; adrenal gland; More reference expression data
BioGPS	n/a
Gene ontology
Molecular function	phosphatidylinositol-4,5-bisphosphate 5-phosphatase activity; protein binding; hydrolase activity; GTPase activator activity; inositol-1,4,5-trisphosphate 5-phosphatase activity; inositol-1,3,4,5-tetrakisphosphate 5-phosphatase activity; phosphatidylinositol phosphate 4-phosphatase activity; phosphatidylinositol-3,5-bisphosphate 5-phosphatase activity; inositol phosphate phosphatase activity
Cellular component	cytoplasm; cytosol; endosome; phagocytic vesicle membrane; Golgi apparatus; cell projection; early endosome membrane; membrane; plasma membrane; cilium; Golgi-associated vesicle; trans-Golgi network; early endosome; Golgi stack; clathrin-coated pit; cytoplasmic vesicle; nucleus; clathrin-coated vesicle; photoreceptor outer segment
Biological process	lipid metabolism; regulation of GTPase activity; in utero embryonic development; inositol phosphate metabolic process; cell projection organization; phosphatidylinositol dephosphorylation; phosphatidylinositol biosynthetic process; regulation of small GTPase mediated signal transduction; signal transduction; positive regulation of GTPase activity; phosphatidylinositol-3-phosphate biosynthetic process; cilium assembly; membrane organization; inositol phosphate dephosphorylation
Sources:Amigo / QuickGO
Orthologs
Databases	NCBI: entry; OMA: entry
Species	Human	Mouse
Entrez	4952	320634
Ensembl	ENSG00000122126	ENSMUSG00000001173
UniProt	Q01968	Q6NVF0
RefSeq (mRNA)	NM_000276; NM_001587; NM_001318784	NM_177215
RefSeq (protein)	NP_000267; NP_001305713; NP_001578	NP_796189
Location (UCSC)	Chr X: 129.54 – 129.59 Mb	Chr X: 47.91 – 47.97 Mb
PubMed search
- Wikidata
View/Edit Human	View/Edit Mouse

Inositol polyphosphate 5-phosphatase OCRL-1, also known as Lowe oculocerebrorenal syndrome protein, is an enzyme encoded by the OCRL gene located on the X chromosome in humans.

This gene encodes an inositol polyphosphate 5-phosphatase. The responsible gene locus is at Xq26.1. This phosphatase enzyme is in part responsible for regulating membrane trafficking actin polymerization, and is located in several subcellular parts of the trans-Golgi network.

Deficiencies in OCRL-1 are associated with oculocerebrorenal syndrome and also have been linked to Dent's disease.
