= Phospho soda =

Laxative product used for colonoscopy preparation

Phospho soda was an over the counter saline laxative produced by the C.B. Fleet Company in Lynchburg, Virginia. Phospho soda consisted mostly of monobasic sodium phosphate monohydrate and dibasic sodium phosphate heptahydrate. Phospho soda is often taken in a double dose (the usual 45ml dose, followed by a second 45ml dose 6 hours later), to prepare for colonoscopy. It is still used outside the US.

An amount of Phospho soda (normally 1.5 fluid ounce or 45 ml) is usually mixed with water or other clear liquids such as ginger ale. This preparation usually results in a bowel movement anywhere from 30 minutes to 6 hours after it is taken. Phospho soda is also available in various flavors to make it more palatable.

== Safety issues ==
The use of Phospho soda has been known to lead to acute phosphate nephropathy. According to the U.S. Food and Drug Administration (FDA), "Acute phosphate nephropathy is a form of acute kidney injury that is associated with deposits of calcium-phosphate crystals in the renal tubules that may result in permanent renal function impairment. Acute phosphate nephropathy is a rare, serious adverse event that has been associated with the use of OSPs [oral sodium phosphates]. The occurrence of these events was previously described in an Information for Healthcare Professionals sheet and an FDA Science Paper issued in May 2006. Additional cases of acute phosphate nephropathy have been reported to FDA and described in the literature since these were issued."

Fleet’s Phospho-soda products have been linked to kidney damage since the 1990s.

On December 11, 2008, the FDA issued a Safety Alert stating that "FDA has become aware of reports of acute phosphate nephropathy, a type of acute kidney injury, associated with the use of oral sodium phosphate products (OSP) for bowel cleansing prior to colonoscopy or other procedures. These products include the prescription products, Visicol and OsmoPrep, and OSPs available over-the-counter without a prescription as laxatives (e.g., Fleet Phospho-soda). In some cases when used for bowel cleansing, these serious adverse events have occurred in patients without identifiable factors that would put them at risk for developing acute kidney injury ... The agency is equally concerned about the risks associated with the use of OSP products that are available over-the-counter (OTC), for example, Fleet Phospho-soda, when used at higher doses for bowel cleansing."

== Recall ==
Following FDA's Alert, C.B. Fleet recalled its Fleet Phospho-Soda Products.

== Use as a laxative ==
Phospho soda can be used for a general laxative, but is not recommended. The dosage then is best cut in half and used only once instead of twice.

Phospho soda works by drawing liquid from the body into the colon, therefore it can cause severe dehydration, especially if not used properly. Usage in this context is highly recommended to be performed only with a doctor's knowledge and consent.

== Use as preparation for colonoscopy ==
When Phospho soda is used as preparation for colonoscopy, 1.5 fluid ounces (45ml), mixed with an equal amount of water or any clear liquid and followed by 8 oz of water, is taken, followed by a second dose 6 hours later (3 oz total). It will cause very loose, eventually watery stools, usually starting within an hour or so and lasting several hours.

A 2007 study showed that in patients with decreased renal function, Phospho soda may worsen renal impairment compared to polyethylene glycol-based laxatives. In patients without kidney problems, no difference was observed.

== Litigation ==
Since late 2004, there has been a great deal of litigation in both state and federal courts alleging renal injury following the use of Fleet Phospho-Soda. On June 23, 2009, the United States Judicial Panel on Multi District Litigation consolidated all federal Oral Sodium Phosphate Solution lawsuits to the Northern District of Ohio, before the Honorable Ann Aldrich. Additional documents from Phospho-Soda lawsuits have been published at the website DangerousDrugs.us.
