= Urine electrolyte levels =

Urine test

Urine electrolyte levels can be measured in a medical laboratory for diagnostic purposes. The urine concentrations of sodium, chlorine and potassium may be used to investigate conditions such as abnormal blood electrolyte levels, acute kidney injury, metabolic alkalosis and hypovolemia. Other electrolytes that can be measured in urine are calcium, phosphorus and magnesium.

Target	Lower limit	Upper limit	Unit	Comments	LOINC Codes
Sodium (Na) – per day	150	300	mmol / 24 h	A sodium-related parameter is fractional sodium excretion, which is the percentage of the sodium filtered by the kidney which is excreted in the urine. It is a useful parameter in acute kidney failure and oliguria, with a value below 1% indicating a prerenal disease and a value above 1% suggesting acute tubular necrosis or other kidney damage.	2956-1
Potassium (K) – per day	40	90	mmol / 24 h	Urine K may be measured in a diagnostic examination for hypokalemia (low blood potassium). If potassium is being lost through the kidneys, urine potassium will likely be high. If urine potassium is low, this suggests a non-renal cause.	
Urinary calcium (Ca) – per day	2.5	6.25	mmol / 24 h	An abnormally high level is called hypercalciuria and an abnormally low rate is called hypocalciuria.	14637-3
Urinary calcium (Ca) – per day	100	250	mg / 24 hours	An abnormally high level is called hypercalciuria and an abnormally low rate is called hypocalciuria.	6874-2
Phosphate (P) – per day	n/a	38	mmol / 24 h	Phosphaturia is the hyperexcretion of phosphate in the urine. This condition is divided into primary and secondary types. Primary hyperphosphaturia is characterized by direct excess excretion of phosphate by the kidneys, as from primary kidney dysfunction, and also the direct action of many classes of diuretics on the kidneys. Additionally, secondary causes, including both types of hyperparathyroidism, cause hyperexcretion of phosphate in the urine.	14881-7
