= Oculocerebrorenal syndrome =

- Other names: Lowe syndrome
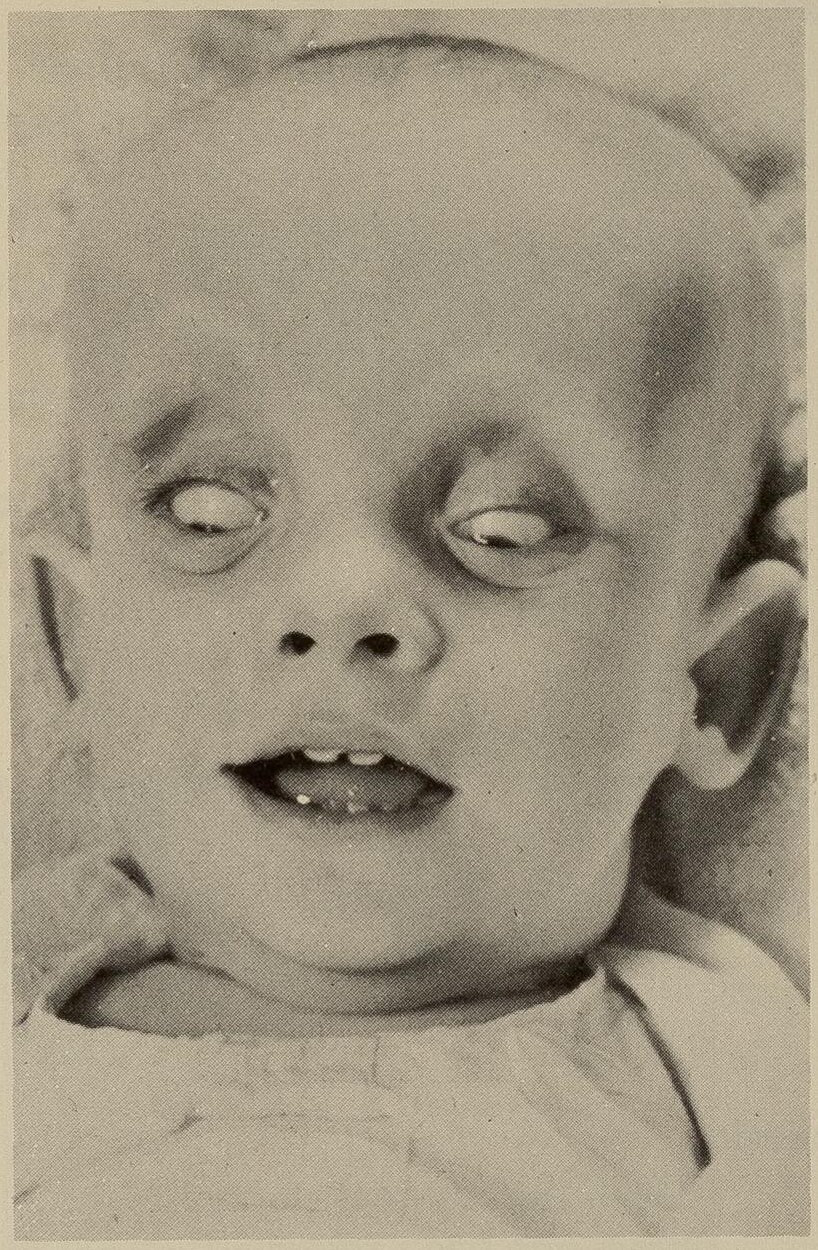
- Infant with oculocerebrorenal syndrome
- Specialty: Obstetrics and gynaecology, urology, neurology, medical genetics, endocrinology, ophthalmology
- Symptoms: Cataracts
- Causes: Mutations in OCRL gene
- Diagnostic method: MRI, urinalysis
- Treatment: Physical therapy, clomipramine

Oculocerebrorenal syndrome (also called Lowe syndrome) is a rare X-linked recessive disorder characterized by congenital cataracts, hypotonia, intellectual disability, proximal tubular acidosis, aminoaciduria and low-molecular-weight proteinuria. Lowe syndrome can be considered a cause of Fanconi syndrome (bicarbonaturia, renal tubular acidosis, potassium loss and sodium loss).

== Signs and symptoms ==
Boys with Lowe syndrome are born with cataracts in both eyes; glaucoma is present in about half of the individuals with Lowe syndrome, though usually not at birth. While not present at birth, kidney problems develop in many affected boys at about one year of age. Renal pathology is characterized by an abnormal loss of certain substances into the urine, including bicarbonate, sodium, potassium, amino acids, organic acids, albumin, calcium and L-carnitine. This problem is known as Fanconi-type renal tubular dysfunction.

== Genetics ==
This syndrome is caused by mutations in the OCRL gene which encodes an inositol polyphosphate-5-phosphatase. At least one mechanism by which these mutations cause this syndrome is by loss of its Rab-binding domain.This protein is associated with the primary cilia of the retinal pigment epithelial cells, fibroblasts and kidney tubular cells. This suggests that this syndrome is due to dysfunction of the cilia in these cells. About 120 mutations are associated with this condition and OCRL gene which is associated with oculocerebrorenal syndrome

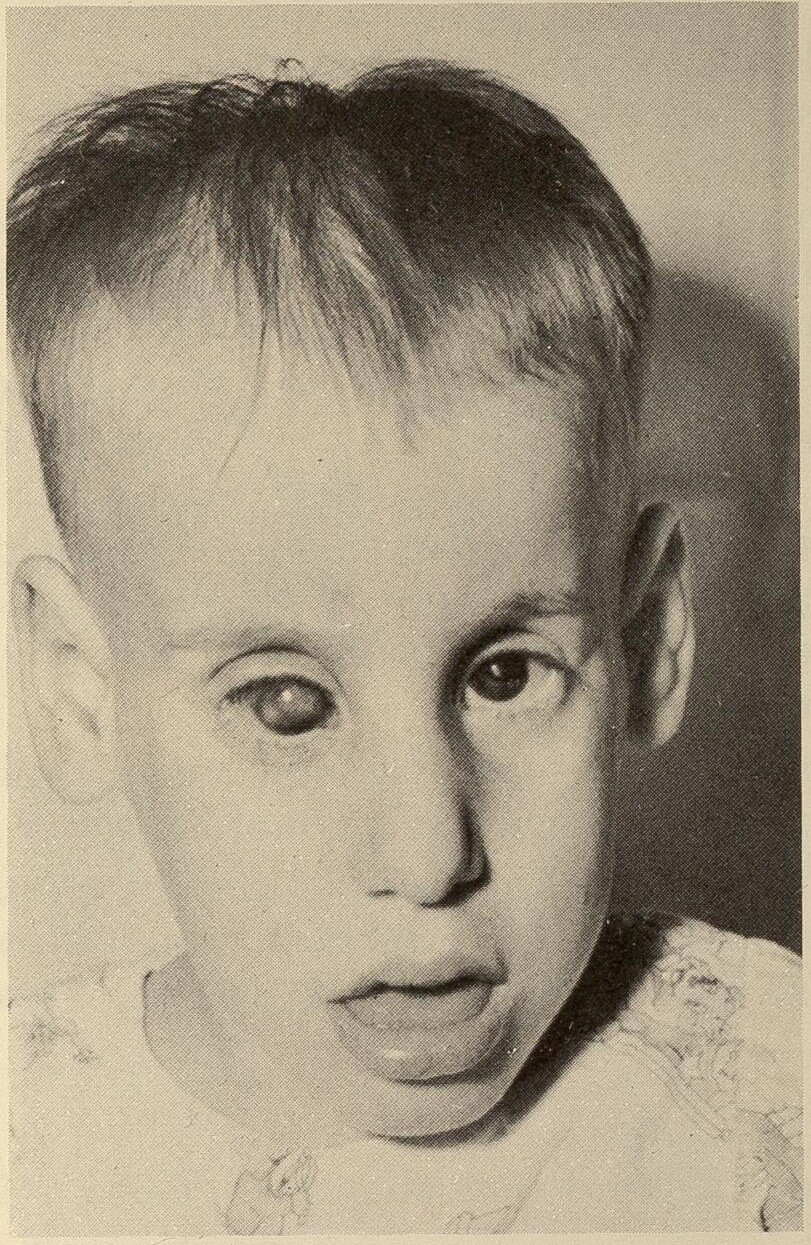
Another Infant with Lowe Syndrome

X-link recessive inheritance

== Diagnosis ==
Diagnosis of oculocerebrorenal syndrome can be done via genetic testing Among the different investigations that can be done are:

- Urinalysis
- MRI
- Blood test

== Treatment ==
Potassium citrate

In terms of treatment of oculocerebrorenal syndrome for those individuals who are affected by this condition includes the following:

- Glaucoma control (via medication)
- Nasogastric tube feeding
- Physical therapy
- Clomipramine
- Potassium citrate

== Epidemiology ==
Because oculocerebrorenal syndrome is an X-linked recessive condition, the disease develops mostly in men with very rare occurrences in women, while women are carriers of the disease; it has an estimated prevalence of 1 in 500,000 people.

== History ==
It was first described in 1952 by American paediatrician Charles Upton Lowe (1921–2012) and colleagues at the Massachusetts General Hospital in Boston. Because of the three major organ systems involved (eyes, brain and kidney), it is known as oculocerebrorenal syndrome.

== See also ==
- List of congenital disorders
