= Hypercalciuria =

Hypercalcinuria
- Other names: Hypercalcinuria
- Specialty: Endocrinology

Hypercalciuria is the condition of elevated calcium in the urine. Chronic hypercalciuria may lead to impairment of renal function, nephrocalcinosis, and chronic kidney disease. Patients with hypercalciuria have kidneys that excrete higher levels of calcium than normal, for which there are many possible causes. Calcium may come from one of two paths: through the gut where higher than normal levels of calcium are absorbed by the body or mobilized from stores in the bones. After initial 24 hour urine calcium testing and additional lab testing, a bone density scan (DSX) may be performed to determine if the calcium is being obtained from the bones.

Hypercalciuria in patients can be due to underlying genetic causes.

== Signs and symptoms ==
There are no clinical signs or symptoms of hypercalciuria itself but elevated calcium in the urine can contribute to accelerated loss of calcium from bone leading to osteoporosis. Additionally, hypercalciuria can contribute to kidney stone formation which may present with flank or back pain that comes and goes. It can be painful to pass kidney stones and in extreme cases cause kidney damage. Patients that both form kidney stones and have hypercalciuria are at increased risk for bone loss leading to osteoporosis.

== Causes ==
There are a number of causes of hypercalciuria including genetic (idiopathic), primary hyperparathyroidism, immobilization, pagets disease, Multiple Myeloma, Calcium excess, Vitamin D excess/increased sensitivity, drug-induced hypercalciuria, sarcoidosis, hyperthyroidism, Cushing's disease, and renal tubular acidosis.

Idiopathic hypercalciuria is defined as elevated calcium in the urine without an identifiable cause despite low to normal calcium intake and otherwise normal lab values. In addition to hypercalciuria, these individuals often have associated low bone density. There can be an underlying genetic component that is beyond current genetic testing available. In familial cases it is common that 50% of first degree relatives are affected. Despite a potential genetic component, urine calcium levels can be influenced by dietary items including sodium, protein, and sugars.

== Diagnosis ==
The gold standard to assess for hypercalciuria is 24-hour urine collection to evaluate urine calcium levels over that time period. Normal range is considered 100 to 300 milligrams per day (mg/day) with standard calcium intake. Hypercalciuria is diagnosed when a value over 300 mg/day is identified.

Additional laboratory testing is warranted in the setting of hypercalciuria in order to identify a potential underlying cause.

== Treatment ==
=== Dietary interventions ===
Patients suffering from low bone density, hypercalciuria, and stone formation should increase daily fluid consumption and focus on a low sodium and low protein diet. Reducing calcium intake to attempt to remedy elevated urine calcium has been shown to further progress bone loss without an effect on urine calcium loss.

=== Pharmacological interventions ===
The use of thiazide diuretics has been effective in reducing urine calcium loss and has an activating effect on bone forming cells. Potassium citrate in conjunction with thiazide diuretics is another medication that has been shown to have a positive impact on bone formation but also decrease the crystallization of calcium based stones in the kidneys.

Other drugs are used to treat osteoporosis, including bisphosphonates, but have not been shown to have an effect on urine calcium levels.

== See also ==
- Kidney stones
- Nephrocalcinosis
- Dent's disease
- Hypercalcaemia, elevated calcium level in the blood
- Vegan nutrition
- Hyperparathyroidism
- Vitamin D toxicity
