= Acute tubular necrosis =

Death of the cells in the renal tubules

- Specialty: Nephrology

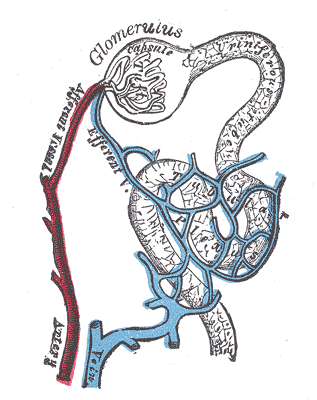

Acute tubular necrosis (ATN) is a medical condition involving the death of tubular epithelial cells that form the renal tubules of the kidneys. Because necrosis is often not present, the term acute tubular injury (ATI) is preferred by pathologists over the older name acute tubular necrosis (ATN). ATN presents with acute kidney injury (AKI) and is one of the most common causes of AKI. Common causes of ATN include low blood pressure and use of nephrotoxic drugs. The presence of "muddy brown casts" of epithelial cells found in the urine during urinalysis is pathognomonic for ATN. Management relies on aggressive treatment of the factors that precipitated ATN (e.g. hydration and cessation of the offending drug). Because the tubular cells continually replace themselves, the overall prognosis for ATN is quite good if the underlying cause is corrected, and recovery is likely within 7 to 21 days.

== Classification ==
ATN may be classified as either toxic or ischemic. Toxic ATN occurs when the tubular cells are exposed to a toxic substance (nephrotoxic ATN). Ischemic ATN occurs when the tubular cells do not get enough oxygen, a condition that they are highly sensitive and susceptible to, due to their very high metabolism. Due to several reasons, the proximal portion of the renal tubule is most commonly injured in ATN.

== Diagnosis ==
Acute tubular necrosis is classified as a "renal" (i.e. not pre-renal or post-renal) cause of acute kidney injury. Diagnosis is made by a FENa (fractional excretion of sodium) > 3% and presence of muddy casts (a type of granular cast) in urinalysis. On histopathology, there is usually tubulorrhexis, that is, localized necrosis of the epithelial lining in renal tubules, with focal rupture or loss of basement membrane. Proximal tubule cells can shed with variable viability and not be purely "necrotic".

== Toxic ATN ==
Toxic ATN can be caused by free hemoglobin or myoglobin, by medication including antibiotics such as aminoglycoside, statins such as atorvastatin, bisphosphonates like pamidronate and cytotoxic drugs such as cisplatin, or by intoxication (ethylene glycol, "anti-freeze").

Histopathology: Toxic ATN is characterized by proximal tubular epithelium necrosis (no nuclei, intense eosinophilic homogeneous cytoplasm, but preserved shape) due to a toxic substance (poisons, organic solvents, drugs, heavy metals). Necrotic cells fall into the tubule lumen, obturating it, and determining acute kidney failure. Basement membrane is intact, so the tubular epithelium regeneration is possible. Glomeruli are not affected.

== Ischemic ATN ==
Ischemic ATN can be caused when the kidneys are not sufficiently perfused for a long period of time (i.e. renal artery stenosis) or during shock. Hypoperfusion can also be caused by embolism of the renal arteries. Given their importance in massive nutrient and electrolyte reabsorption, the proximal tubule and medullary thick ascending limb require significant ATP and are most susceptible to ischemic damage. Thus, ischemic ATN specifically causes skip lesions through the tubules.

Ischemic ATN often involves reperfusion injury to the kidney. When oxygen flow is restored, damage can occur due to oxygen radicals, inflammatory cells and molecules and tissue edema. These processes can exacerbate injury and worsen the prognosis. Nevertheless, restoring blood flow is essential for tissue survival, so clinical strategies aim to minimize the harmful effects.

== See also ==
- Acute interstitial nephritis
- Renal cortical necrosis
- Renal papillary necrosis
