= Aminoaciduria =

- Other names: Urine amino acids
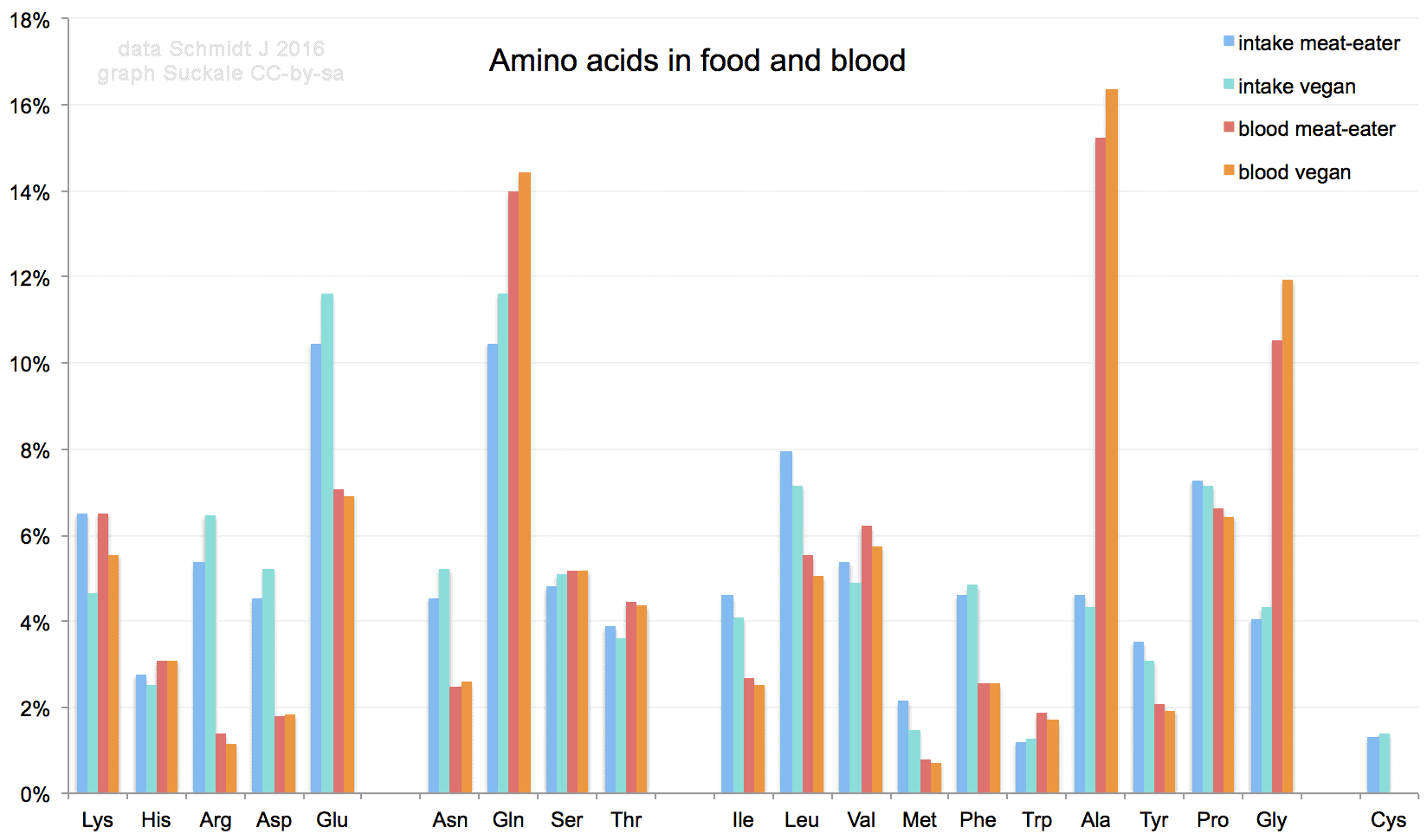
- Share of amino acid in various human diets and the resulting mix of amino acids in human blood serum. Glutamate and glutamine are the most frequent in food at over 10%, while alanine, glutamine, and glycine are the most common in blood.
- Complications: Severe protein loss in the blood
- Risk factors: Liver disease, malnutrition, kidney disease

Aminoaciduria occurs when the urine contains abnormally high amounts of amino acids. In the healthy kidney, the glomeruli filter all amino acids out of the blood, and the renal tubules then reabsorb over 95% of the filtered amino acids back into the blood.

In overflow aminoaciduria, abnormally high concentrations of amino acids in the blood plasma overwhelm the resorptive capacity of the renal tubules, resulting in high concentrations of amino acids in the urine. This may be caused by congenital disorders of amino acid metabolism, for example, phenylketonuria, or may be secondary to liver disease.

In renal aminoaciduria, the renal tubules are unable to reabsorb the filtered amino acids back into the blood, causing high concentrations of amino acids in the urine. This may be caused by a defect in the transport proteins in the renal tubule, for example, as occurs in Hartnup disease, or may be due to damage to the kidney tubule, for example, as occurs in Fanconi syndrome.
