= Potassium citrate =

Names
- Preferred IUPAC name Tripotassium 2-hydroxypropane-1,2,3-tricarboxylate

Identifiers
CAS Number	866-84-2
3D model (JSmol)	Interactive image
ChEMBL	ChEMBL1200458
ChemSpider	12775
ECHA InfoCard	100.011.596
E number	E332(ii) (antioxidants, ...)
PubChem CID	13344
UNII	86R1NVR0HW
CompTox Dashboard (EPA)	DTXSID8027325
- InChI: InChI=1S/C6H8O7.3K/c7-3(8)1-6(13,5(11)12)2-4(9)10;;;/h13H,1-2H2,(H,7,8)(H,9,10)(H,11,12);;;/q;3*+1/p-3 Key: QEEAPRPFLLJWCF-UHFFFAOYSA-K; InChI=1/C6H8O7.3K/c7-3(8)1-6(13,5(11)12)2-4(9)10;;;/h13H,1-2H2,(H,7,8)(H,9,10)(H,11,12);;;/q;3*+1/p-3 Key: QEEAPRPFLLJWCF-DFZHHIFOAD
- SMILES: [K+].[K+].[K+].O=C([O-])CC(O)(C([O-])=O)CC(=O)[O-]

Properties
Chemical formula	K_{3}C_{6}H_{5}O_{7}
Molar mass	306.395 g/mol
Appearance	white powder hygroscopic
Odor	odorless
Density	1.98 g/cm^{3}
Melting point	180 °C (356 °F; 453 K)
Boiling point	230 °C (446 °F; 503 K)
Solubility in water	soluble
Solubility	soluble in glycerin insoluble in ethanol (95%)
Acidity (pK_{a})	8.5

Pharmacology
ATC code	A12BA02 (WHO)

Hazards
- Lethal dose or concentration (LD, LC)
LD_{50} (median dose)	170 mg/kg (IV, dog); 5400mg/kg (oral, rat)
- Except where otherwise noted, data are given for materials in their standard state (at 25 °C [77 °F], 100 kPa). verify (what is ?) Infobox references

Potassium citrate (also known as tripotassium citrate) is a potassium salt of citric acid with the molecular formula K_{3}C_{6}H_{5}O_{7}. It is a white, hygroscopic crystalline powder. It is odorless with a saline taste. It contains 38.28% potassium by mass. In the monohydrate form, it is highly hygroscopic and deliquescent.

As a food additive, potassium citrate is used to regulate acidity, and is known as E number E332. Medicinally, it may be used to control kidney stones derived from uric acid or cystine.

In 2020, it was the 297th most commonly prescribed medication in the United States, with more than 1 million prescriptions.

== Synthesis ==
Potassium citrate can be synthesized by the neutralization of citric acid which is achieved by the addition of potassium bicarbonate, potassium carbonate or potassium hydroxide to it. The solution can then be filtered and the solvent can be evaporated till granulation.

== Uses ==
Potassium citrate is rapidly absorbed when given by mouth, and is excreted in the urine. Since it is an alkaline salt, it is effective in reducing the pain and frequency of urination when these are caused by highly acidic urine. It is used for this purpose in dogs and cats, but is chiefly employed as a non-irritating diuretic.

Potassium citrate is an effective way to treat/manage arrhythmia, if the patient is hypokalemic.

It is widely used to treat urinary calculi (kidney stones) and bladder stones, and is often used by patients with cystinuria. A systematic review showed a significant reduction in the incidence of kidney stone formation RR 0.26, 95% CI 0.10 to 0.68.

It is also used as an alkalizing agent in the treatment of mild urinary tract infections, such as cystitis.

It is also used in many soft drinks as a buffering agent.

Frequently used in an aqueous solution with other potassium salts, it is a wet chemical fire suppressant that is particularly useful against kitchen fires. Its alkaline pH encourages saponification to insulate the fuel from oxidizing air, and the endothermic dehydration reaction absorbs heat energy to reduce temperatures.

== Administration ==
Potassium citrate liquid is usually administered by mouth in a diluted aqueous solution, because of its somewhat caustic effect on the stomach lining, and the potential for other mild health hazards. Pill tablets also exist in normal, and extended-release formulations.
