= Christopher Evans (businessman) =

Welsh professor, scientist and biotechnology entrepreneur (born 1957)

Sir Christopher Evans OBE ARCS FMedSci FREng FRSC FRSA FIBiol CCMI CChem
- Born: Christopher Thomas Evans; 29 November 1957 (age 68); Port Talbot, Wales
- Education: Imperial College London; University of Hull
- Occupations: Biotechnology entrepreneur; scientist
- Title: Professor
- Spouse: Lady Anne Evans

Sir Christopher Thomas Evans OBE ARCS FMedSci FREng FRSC FRSA FIBiol CCMI CChem (born 29 November 1957) is a Welsh professor, scientist and biotechnology entrepreneur. Evans has founded and co-founded numerous biotech companies in the United Kingdom.

Since the 1980s, Evans has launched and supported more than 50 companies in the biotechnology sector, including 20 listed on six different stock markets. Many have specialized in their goal of creating unique products and medicines, as well as conducting clinical trials. These include an S-Ketoprofen anti-inflammatory pharmaceutical, single isomer chiral synthons for use in new anti-viral drugs, a single-isomer levobupivacaine for local anaesthesia, the pre-eminent rapid bioluminescent test for bacterial contamination, numerous enzymes and proteins for use in clinical diagnostic tests, as well as stem cell therapies, immunotherapeutics, oncology drugs and respiratory devices.

== Early life and education ==
Evans was born in 1957, in Port Talbot, to Cyril and Jeanette (née Cottey) Evans. He attended St Joseph's School in Port Talbot before studying microbiology at Imperial College London. He then obtained a PhD from the University of Hull and Porton Down, followed by a research fellowship at the University of Michigan.

== Career ==
Evans' first company, Enzymatix, was one of the earliest biotech companies in Europe. Its early work involved the use of cabbages and eggs to mass-produce phospholipids which were used in surfactants to help premature babies breathe. Evans was a co-founder of the biotech business Chiroscience, which was founded in 1991. The company made a number of breakthroughs in the early 1990s. It developed an anesthetic known as Chirocaine, and discovered Romosozumab, which was later acquired by Celltech.

In 1992, Evans was the founder of Celsis, which was based in Cambridge, UK. It specialised in contamination detectors, which included a test to detect E.coli in water. Chiroscience became one of the UK's first biotech companies to go public in 1994, when it filed for its initial public offering. Evans remained at the business for several more years and left prior to its merger with Celltech in 1999.

Evans founded a number of ventures under the Merlin group. During the 1990s, Merlin focused on partnering with entrepreneurs to create new businesses, in a similar way to how seed funding is now used. Early investments were made in over 20 life science companies. A £2.5 million investment was made in Cyclacel in 1997.

In 1994, Evans founded Toad, a vehicle technology company specializing in car security devices which went to be a publicly listed company.

In 1997, Evans co-founded ReNeuron, a stem cell research company. The company's research focused on treatments to reverse the effects of neurological diseases.

In 1998, Evans founded Biovex, a company which specialized in the development of a genetically modified herpes virus which kills off cancer cells. The company was sold to Amgen in 2011 for $1 billion. Later that year, Lord David Puttnam assembled a team of eight trustees for the National Endowment for Science, Technology and the Arts, which included Evans. This later became known as Nesta. It was awarded £200 million by the British government in the 1998 budget. In 2000, ReNeuron was listed on the Alternative Investment Market in a £60 million listing.

In 2004, Vectura, a respiratory drug company founded by Evans was listed on the Alternative Investment Market. In 2021, The Philip Morris Group made a successful bid of £1billion for the company. Arakis Limited, one of the companies developed by Evans was sold to Sosei Co., Ltd for £106.5 million in 2005.

Evans’ Excalibur Group sold Piramed, which developed treatments for cancer and autoimmune diseases to Roche in 2008 for £175 million.

In 2013, Evans founded Arthurian Life Sciences, which aimed to bring biotech investment into the Welsh economy. A year later, it worked with the Welsh Government to create and build the Wales Life Sciences Investment Fund, a £100 million 50/50 joint venture life sciences investment fund created to attract business to Wales. The fund has invested in and provided grants to ReNeuron, in which Evans also invested.

In 2015, Evans led the investment funding for Proton Partners International to create the UK's first network of centres offering proton beam therapy, a specialized form of radiotherapy. Proton Partners later became Rutherford Health and Evans remained a non-executive director. In 2016, Evans founded and became deputy chairman of Arix Bioscience, a health and life sciences company investing in medical innovation. The company was listed on the London Stock Exchange with a market cap of £200 million in 2017.

In 2017, founded and became chairman of Ellipses Pharma, a company specializing in the development of new cancer drugs.

In 2019, Evans created Excalibur Healthcare Services to specialize in international medical supplies, clinical research and development, diagnostics and testing. The company was formally incorporated in January 2020.

In April 2020, Excalibur was at the first phase of a clinical trial which could help diabetics who contract COVID-19. The trial was arranged and structured by Evans. The second phase of the trial received £10 million in funding in August 2020.

== Awards ==
Evans holds 10 honorary professorships, 6 fellowships and a doctorate in sciences. He has been the author of more than 100 scientific publications and patents.

In 1998, he became the youngest recipient of Society of Chemical Industry Centenary Medal and was awarded the Henderson Memorial Medal. In the same year, he received the Royal Society of Chemistry Interdisciplinary Medal.

Evans has twice been the recipient of "Cambridge Businessman of the Year" in 1996 and 1998.

He was awarded the OBE in 1995 and knighted in 2001. He was appointed an Honorary Fellow of the Royal Academy of Engineering in 2005. In March of that year, he was appointed by Gordon Brown to the UK Stem Cell Initiative. He made a £1 million loan to the British Labour Party during 2005, which became part of a wider police investigation into party donations, but on 19 July 2007 the UK Crown Prosecution Service announced he was cleared of any wrongdoing.

== Personal life ==
Evans lives in the Cotswolds, and was listed in the Sunday Times Rich List 2020 in 583rd place with an estimated fortune of £208 million. He has a wife and four adult children.

== Philanthropy ==
In 2018, Evans launched the Evamore project, a musical collaboration inspired by the letters of First World War soldiers.

The first release from the project, "One More Yard", was written by Evans and published in November 2018 to mark the centenary of Armistice Day. Sinéad O'Connor sang lead vocals on the track, with supporting vocals by Imelda May. Guitar was played by Ronnie Wood, with Nick Mason playing on drums, while instrumentation was provided by Brian Eno and spoken word excerpts recorded by actor Cillian Murphy.

Proceeds from Evamore were donated to The Cancer Awareness Trust, a charity founded by Evans which aims to build ‘useful, reliable and easily understood information’ for use by individuals who have been diagnosed with cancer.

Evans founded The UK Stem Cell Foundation in 2005, a charity focused on funding stem cell research.
