= Medication-related osteonecrosis of the jaw =

- Other names: MON of the jaw, Medication-related osteonecrosis of the jaw (MRONJ), Medication-induced osteonecrosis of the jaw (MIONJ), Bisphosphonate-related osteonecrosis of the jaw (BRONJ) (formerly)
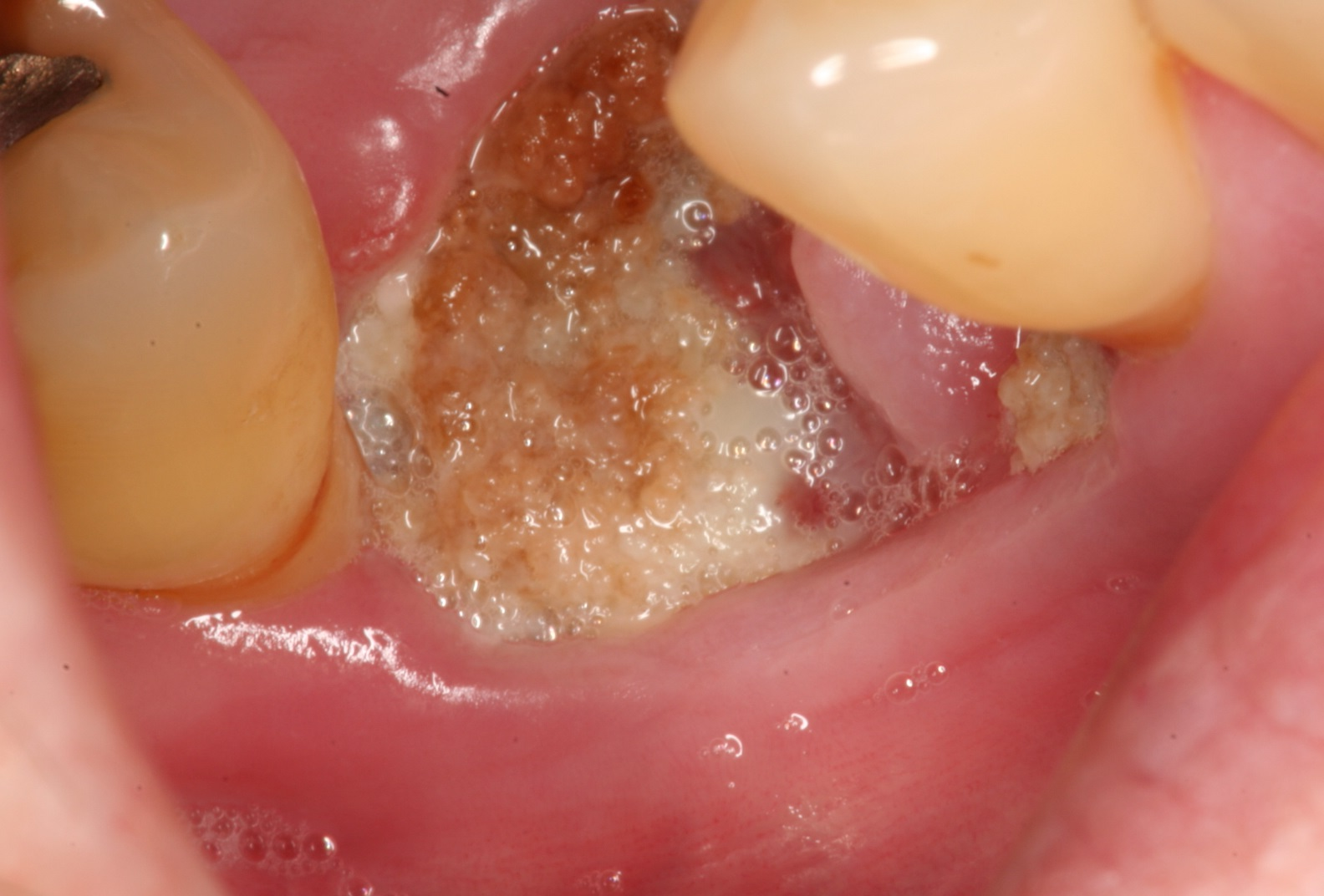
- Specialty: Oral and maxillofacial surgery
- Symptoms: Exposed bone after extraction, pain
- Complications: Osteomyelitis of the jaw
- Usual onset: After dental extractions
- Duration: Variable
- Types: Stage 1-Stage 3
- Causes: Medications related to cancer therapy, and osteoporosis in combination with dental surgery
- Risk factors: Duration of anti-resorptive or anti-angiogenic drugs, intravenous vs by-mouth
- Diagnostic method: Exposed bone >8 weeks
- Differential diagnosis: Osteomyelitis, Osteoradionecrosis
- Prevention: Having all dental work done before taking biphosphonates, maintaining healthy teeth in order for no future dental work being done.
- Treatment: antibacterial rinses, antibiotics, removal exposed bone
- Prognosis: good
- Frequency: 0.2% for those on biphosphonate type drugs >4 years

Medication-related osteonecrosis of the jaw (MON, MRONJ) is progressive death of the jawbone in a person exposed to a medication known to increase the risk of disease, in the absence of a previous radiation treatment. It may lead to surgical complication in the form of impaired wound healing following oral and maxillofacial surgery, periodontal surgery, or endodontic therapy.

Particular medications can result in MRONJ, a serious but uncommon side effect in certain individuals. Such medications are frequently used to treat diseases that cause bone resorption such as osteoporosis, or to treat cancer. The main groups of drugs involved are anti-resorptive drugs, and anti-angiogenic drugs.

This condition was previously known as bisphosphonate-related osteonecrosis of the jaw (BON or BRONJ) because osteonecrosis of the jaw correlating with bisphosphonate treatment was frequently encountered, with its first incident occurring in 2003. Osteonecrotic complications associated with denosumab, another antiresorptive drug from a different drug category, were soon determined to be related to this condition. Newer medications such as anti-angiogenic drugs have been potentially implicated causing a very similar condition and consensus shifted to refer to the related conditions as MRONJ; however, this has not been definitively demonstrated.

There is no known prevention for bisphosphonate-associated osteonecrosis of the jaw. Avoiding the use of bisphosphonates is not a viable preventive strategy on a general-population basis because the medications are beneficial in the treatment and prevention of osteoporosis (including prevention of bony fractures) and treatment of bone cancers. Current recommendations are for a 2-month drug holiday prior to dental surgery for those who are at risk (intravenous drug therapy, greater than 4 years of by-mouth drug therapy, other factors that increase risk such as steroid therapy).

It usually develops after dental treatments involving exposure of bone or trauma, but may arise spontaneously. Patients who develop MRONJ may experience prolonged healing, pain, swelling, infection and exposed bone after dental procedures, though some patients may have no signs/symptoms.

== Definition ==
According to the updated 2014 AAOMS position paper (modified from 2009), in order to distinguish MRONJ, the working definition claims patients may be considered to have MRONJ if all the following characteristics are present:

1. Current or previous treatment with anti-resorptive or anti-angiogenic therapy
2. Expose bone or bone that can be probed through intra-oral or extra-oral fistula in the maxillofacial region that has persisted for longer than 8 weeks.
3. No history of radiation therapy or metastatic disease to the jaw.

Osteonecrosis, or localized death of bone tissue, of the jaws, is a rare potential complication in cancer patients receiving treatments including radiation, chemotherapy, or in patients with tumors or infectious embolic events. In 2003, reports surfaced of the increased risk of osteonecrosis in patients receiving these therapies concomitant with intravenous bisphosphonate. Matrix metalloproteinase-2 may be a candidate gene for bisphosphonate-associated osteonecrosis of the jaws, since it is the only gene known to be associated with both bone abnormalities and atrial fibrillation, another side effect of bisphosphonates.

In response to the growing base of literature on this association, the United States Food and Drug Administration issued a broad drug class warning of this complication for all bisphosphonates in 2005.

== Signs and symptoms ==
Two extraction sites in the same person on denosumab.

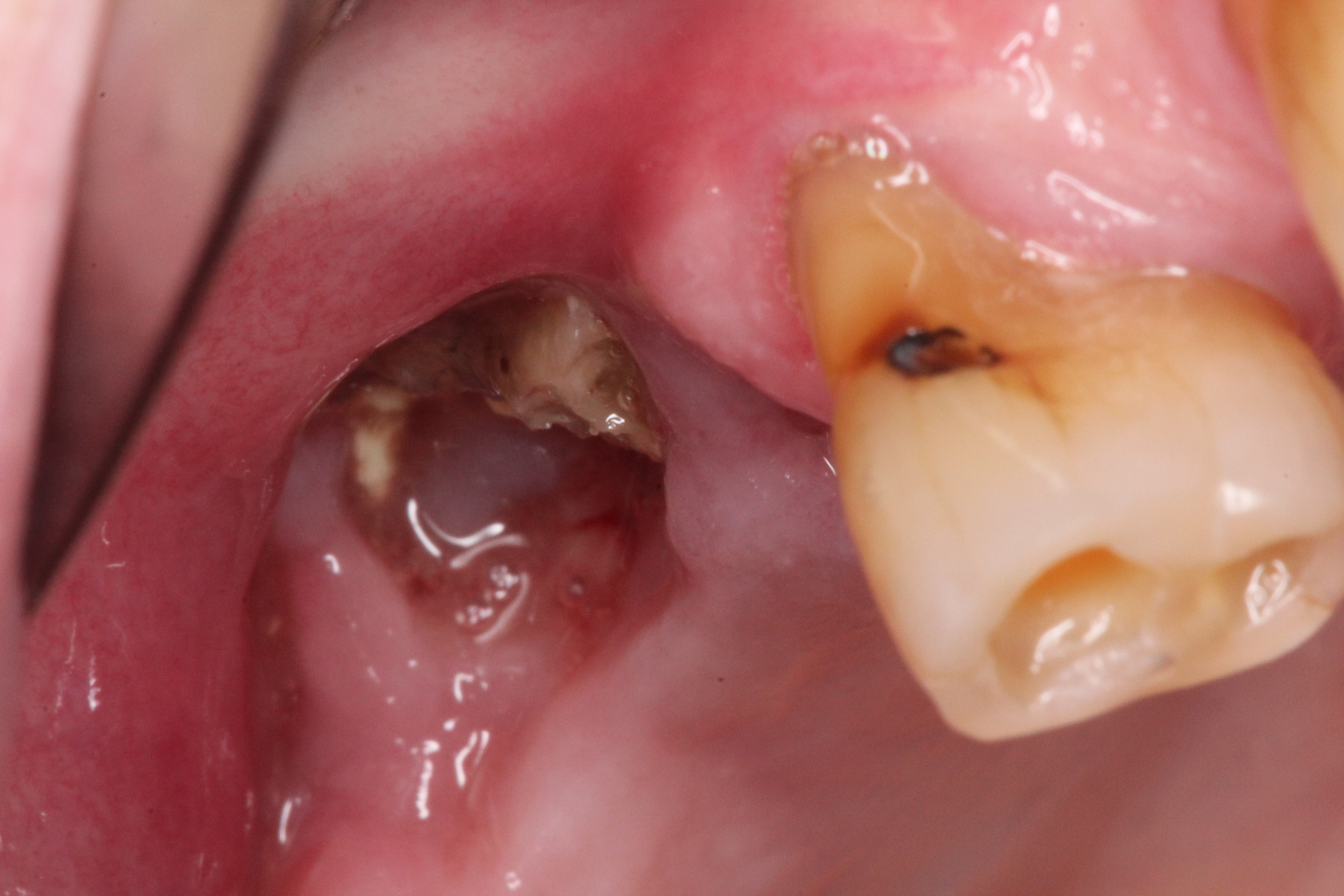
Exposed bone upper right molar 10 weeks after tooth removal.

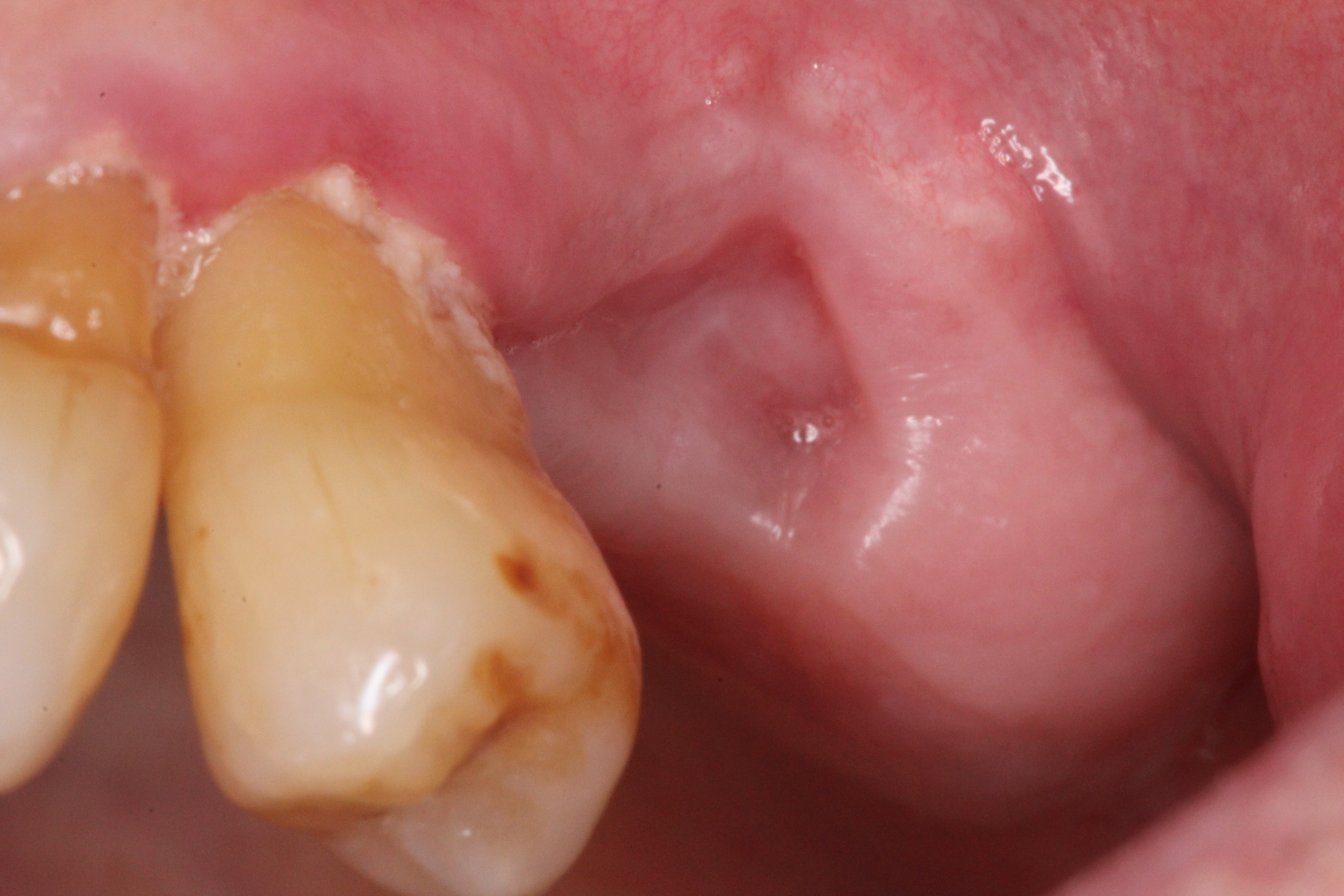
Well healed socket upper left molar 10 weeks after tooth removal.

Classically, MRONJ will cause an ulcer or areas of necrotic bone for weeks, months, or even years following a tooth extraction. While the exposed, dead bone does not cause symptoms these areas often have mild pain from the inflammation of the surrounding tissues. Clinical signs and symptoms associated with, but not limited to MRONJ, include:

- Jaw pain and neuropathy
- Loose teeth
- Mucosal swelling
- Erythema
- Suppuration
- Soft tissue ulceration persisting for more than 8 weeks
- Trismus
- Non-healing extraction sockets
- Paraesthesia or numbness in the jaw
- Bad breath
- Exposed necrotic jaw bone

== Cause ==
Cases of MRONJ have also been associated with the use of the following two intravenous and three oral bisphosphonates, respectively: zoledronic acid and pamidronate and alendronate, risedronate, and ibandronate. Despite the fact that it remains vague as to what the actual cause is, scientists and doctors believe that there is a correlation between the necrosis of the jaw and time of exposure to bisphosphonates. Causes are also thought to be related to bone injury in patients using bisphosphonates as stated by Remy H Blanchaert in an article about the matter.

=== Risk factors ===
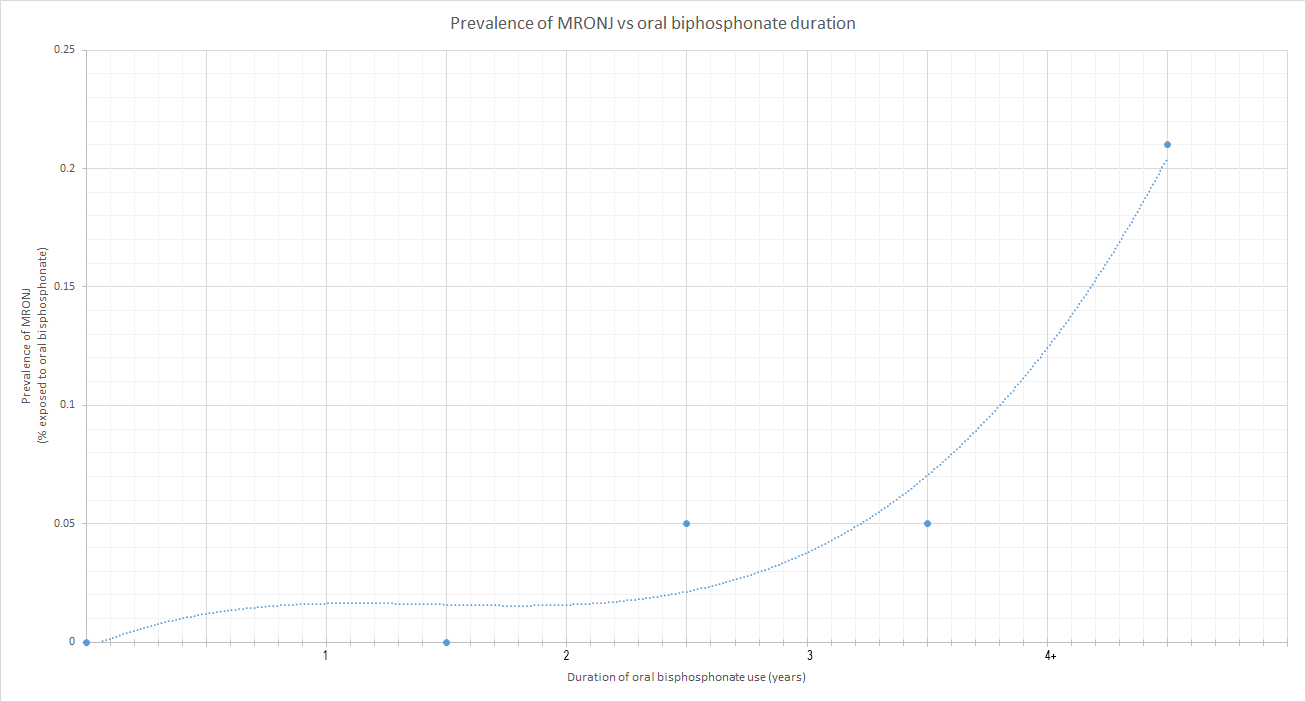
MRONJ: Duration of oral biphosphonate use vs risk of MRONJ

The overwhelming majority of MRONJ diagnoses, however, were associated with intravenous administration of bisphosphonates (94%). Only the remaining 6% of cases arose in patients taking bisphosphonates orally.

Although the total United States prescriptions for oral bisphosphonates exceeded 30 million in 2006, less than 10% of MRONJ cases were associated with patients taking oral bisphosphonate drugs. Studies have estimated that BRONJ occurs in roughly 20% of patients taking intravenous zoledronic acid for cancer therapy and in between 0–0.04% of patients taking orally administered bisphosphonates.

Owing to prolonged embedding of bisphosphonate drugs in the bone tissues, the risk for MRONJ is elevated even after stopping the administration of the medication for several years.

Patients who stopped taking anti-angiogenic drugs are exposed to the same risk as patients who have never taken the drugs because anti-angiogenic drugs do not normally reside in the body for a long period of time.

Risk factors include:

- Dental treatment (e.g. dentoalveolar surgery/procedure that impacts bone) – it is possible for MRONJ to occur spontaneously without any recent invasive dental treatment
- Duration of bisphosphonate drug therapy – increased risk with increased cumulative dose of drug
- Other concurrent medication – use of chronic systemic glucocorticoid increases risk when they are taken in combination with anti-resorptive drugs
- Dental implants
- Drug holidays – no evidence to support a reduction in MRONJ risk if patients stop taking bisphosphonates temporarily/permanently, as drugs can persist in skeletal tissues for many years
- Treatment in the past with anti-resorptive/anti-angiogenic drugs
- Patient being treated for cancer – higher risk
- Patients being treated for osteoporosis/non-malignant bone diseases (e.g. Paget's disease) – lower risk

=== Research findings ===
'The risk of MRONJ after dental extraction was significantly higher in patients treated with ARD (antiresorptive drugs) for oncological reasons (3.2%) than in those treated with ARD for OP (osteoporosis) (0.15%) (p < 0.0001). Dental extraction performed with adjusted extraction protocols decreased MRONJ development significantly. Potential risk indicators such as concomitant medications and pre-existing osteomyelitis were identified.'

=== Patient risk categories ===
Low:

- Treatment of osteoporosis or non-malignant bone disease with oral bisphosphonates for <5 years (not taking systemic glucocorticoids)
- Treatment of osteoporosis or non-malignant bone disease with quarterly/yearly infusions of intravenous bisphosphonates for <5 years (not taking systemic glucocorticoids)
- Treatment of osteoporosis or non-malignant bone disease with denosumab (not taking systemic glucocorticoids)

High:

- Patients being treated for osteoporosis or non-malignant bone disease with oral bisphosphonates/quarterly or yearly infusions of intravenous bisphosphonates for >5 years
- Patients being treated for osteoporosis or non-malignant bone disease with bisphosphonates/denosumab for any length of time as well as being treated with systemic glucocorticoids
- Patients being treated with anti-resorptive/anti-angiogenic drugs/both as part of cancer management
- Previous MRONJ diagnosis

"N.B. Patients who have taken bisphosphonate drugs at any time in the past and those who have taken denosumab in the last nine months are allocated to a risk group as if they are still taking the drug."

=== Anti-resorptive drugs ===
Anti-resorptive drugs inhibit osteoclast differentiation and function, slowing down the breakdown of bone. They are usually prescribed for patients with osteoporosis/osteopenia, or cancer metastasis to bone, such as breast, prostate cancer and multiple myeloma. These drugs are also used for rare conditions like Paget's disease, osteogenesis imperfecta and fibrous dysplasia.

The two main types of anti-resorptive drugs are bisphosphonate and denosumab. These drugs help to decrease the risk of bone fracture and bone pain.

Because the mandible has poorer blood circulation, it is more affected by the effects of these drugs.

1. Bisphosphonate
  - Bisphosphonates are either administered orally or intravenously. They reduce bone resorption.
  - Mechanism of action: Bisphosphonate binds to the mineral component of the bone and inhibits enzymes (i.e. farnesyl-pyrophosphate synthase) responsible for bone formation, osteoclast recruitment and osteoclast function.
  - This type of drug has a high affinity for hydroxyapatite and stays in bone tissue for a long period of time, with alendronate, it has a half-life of approximately ten years.
  - The risk of a patient having MRONJ after discontinuing this medication is unknown.
  - There are suggestions that bisphosphonate may inhibit the proliferation of soft tissue cells and increases apoptosis. This may result in delayed soft tissue healing.
  - Examples of bisphosphonates: : Zoledronic acid (Reclast, Zometa), Risedronate (Actonel), Alendronate (Fosamax), Etidronate (Didronel), Ibandronate (Boniva), Pamidronate (Aredia), Tiludronate (Skelid).
2. Denosumab
  - Denosumab is a monoclonal antibody which is administrated subcutaneously. It inhibits osteoclast differentiation and activation, reduces bone resorption, improves bone density and lessens skeletal-related events associated with metastasis.
  - Mechanism of action: The drug binds to receptor activator nuclear factor κB ligand (RANKL), preventing the interaction with RANK.
  - It does not bind to bone and its effect on bone diminishes in 9 months.

Osteoanabolic drugs

- Purely osteoanabolic agents such as the PTH analogs, teriparatide and abaloparatide, are not associated with osteonecrosis and have actually been shown to be an effective treatment for it.
- Romosozumab, which has dual anti-resorptive and osteoanabolic mechanism of action, contains a labeled warning for ONJ, though a large real-world study found that events of ONJ were very rare during the one year of treatment with romosozumab.

=== Anti-angiogenic drugs ===
Osteonecrosis of the jaw has been identified as one of the possible complications of taking anti-angiogenic drugs; the association of the disease with the medication is known as MRONJ. This has been stated in the Drug Safety Updates by the MHRA.

Angiogenesis inhibitors interfere with blood vessel formation by interfering with the angiogenesis signalling cascade. They are used primarily to treat cancer. These cancer-fighting agents tend to hinder the growth of blood vessels that supply the tumour, rather than killing tumour cells directly. They prevent the tumour from growing. For example, bevacizumab/aflibercept is a monoclonal antibody that specifically binds to vascular endothelial growth factor (VEGF), preventing VEGF from binding to receptors on the surface of normal endothelial cells. Sunitinib is a different example of an anti-angiogenic drug; it inhibits cellular signalling by targeting multiple receptor tyrosine kinases. It reduces the blood supply to the tumour by inhibiting new blood vessel formation in the tumor. The tumour may stop growing or even shrink.

== Pathogenesis ==
Although the methods of action are not yet completely understood, it is hypothesized that medication-associated osteonecrosis of the jaw is related to a defect in jaw bone healing and remodelling.

The inhibition of osteoclast differentiation and function, precipitated by drug therapy, leads to decreased bone resorption and remodelling. Evidence also suggests bisphosphonates induce apoptosis of osteoclasts. Another suggested factor is inhibition of angiogenesis due to bisphosphonates; this effect remains uncertain. Several studies have proposed that bisphosphonates cause excessive reduction of bone turnover, resulting in a higher risk of bone necrosis when repair is needed.

It is also thought that bisphosphonates bind to osteoclasts and interfere with the remodeling mechanism in bone. To be more specific, the drug interferes with the cholesterol biosynthesis pathway through the inhibition of farnesyl diphosphate synthase. Over time, the cytoskeleton of the osteoclasts loses its function and the essential border needed for bone resorption does not form. Like aminobisphosphonates, bisphosphonates have shown to have antiangiogenic properties. Therefore, effects include an overall decrease in bone recycling/turnover as well as an increased inhibition of the absorptive bone abilities.

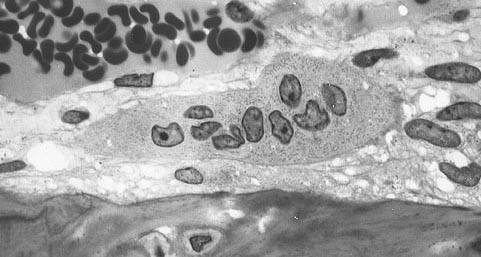
Light micrograph of an osteoclast displaying typical distinguishing characteristics: a large cell with multiple nuclei and a "foamy" cytosol.

One theory is that because bisphosphonates are preferentially deposited in bone with high turnover, it is possible that the levels of bisphosphonate within the jaw are selectively elevated. To date, there have been no reported cases of bisphosphonate-associated complications within bones outside the craniofacial skeleton.

== Diagnosis ==
A diagnosis of bisphosphonate-associated osteonecrosis of the jaw relies on three criteria:

1. the patient possesses an area of exposed bone in the jaw persisting for more than 8 weeks,
2. the patient must present with no history of radiation therapy to the head and neck
3. the patient must be taking or have taken bisphosphonate medication.

According to the updated 2009 BRONJ Position Paper published by the American Association of Oral and Maxillofacial Surgeons, both the potency of and the length of exposure to bisphosphonates are linked to the risk of developing bisphosphonate-associated osteonecrosis of the jaw.

In the 2014 AAOMS update on MRONJ, a staging and treatment strategies table was created:

Staging and Treatment Strategies*Exposed or probable bone in the maxillofacial region without resolution for greater than 8 weeks in patients treated with an antiresorptive and/or an antiangiogenic agent who have not received radiation therapy to the jaws. **Regardless of the disease stage, mobile segments of bony sequestrum should be removed without exposing uninvolved bone. The extraction of symptomatic teeth within exposed, necrotic bone should be considered since it is unlikely that the extraction will exacerbate the established necrotic process.
MRONJ Staging	Criteria* (>8 weeks)	Treatment Strategies**	Picture
At risk	No apparent necrotic bone in patients who have been treated with either oral or IV bisphosphonates	No treatment indicated, Patient education	N/A
Stage 0	No clinical evidence of necrotic bone, but non-specific clinical findings, radiographic changes and symptoms	Systemic management, including the use of pain medication and antibiotics	N/A
Stage 1	Exposed and necrotic bone, or fistulae that probes to bone, in patients who are asymptomatic and have no evidence of infection	Antibacterial mouth rinse, Clinical follow-up on a quarterly basis, Patient education and review of indications for continued bisphosphonate therapy	
Stage 2	Exposed and necrotic bone, or fistulae that probes to bone, associated with infection as evidenced by pain and erythema in the region of the exposed bone with or without purulent drainage	Symptomatic treatment with oral antibiotics, Oral antibacterial mouth rinse, Pain control, Debridement to relieve soft tissue irritation and infection control	
Stage 3	Exposed and necrotic bone or a fistula that probes to bone in patients with pain, infection, and one or more of the following: exposed and necrotic bone extending beyond the region of alveolar bone (i.e., inferior border and ramus in the mandible, maxillary sinus and zygoma in the maxilla) resulting in pathologic fracture, extra-oral fistula, oral antral/oral nasal communication, or osteolysis extending to the inferior border of the mandible or sinus floor	Antibacterial mouth rinse, Antibiotic therapy and pain control, Surgical debridement/resection for longer term palliation of infection and pain	

== Prevention ==
Tooth extraction is the major risk factor for development of MRONJ. Prevention including the maintenance of good oral hygiene, comprehensive dental examination and dental treatment including extraction of teeth of poor prognosis and dentoalveolar surgery should be completed prior to commencing any medication which is likely to cause osteonecrosis (ONJ). Patients with removable prostheses should be examined for areas of mucosal irritation. Procedures which are likely to cause direct osseous trauma, e.g. tooth extraction, dental implants, complex restoration, deep root planning, should be avoided in preference of other dental treatments. There are limited data to support or refute the benefits of a drug holiday for osteoporotic patients receiving antiresorptive therapy. However, a theoretical benefit may still apply for those patients with extended exposure histories (>4 yr), and current recommendations are for a 2 month holiday for those at risk.

There was low quality evidence suggesting taking antibiotics prior to the dental extraction, as well as the use of post operative techniques for wound closure lowered the risk of patients developing medication-related osteonecrosis of the jaw compared with the usual standard care received for regular dental extractions. Post operative wound closure has been suggested to prevent the contamination of the underlying bone. More evidence is needed to assess the use of antibiotics prior to treatment and the use of wound closure to prevent contamination of the bone, as the quality of evidence evaluated was low.

Patients may be advised to limit alcohol consumption, stop smoking, and practice good dental hygiene. It is also advised for individuals who take bisphosphonates to never allow the tablet to dissolve in the mouth as this causes damage to the oral mucosa.

== Management ==
Treatment usually involves antimicrobial mouth washes and oral antibiotics to help the immune system fight the attendant infection, and it also often involves local surgery(resection) to get rid of the dead bone (necrotic bone lesion). Many patients with MRONJ have successful outcomes after treatment, meaning that the local osteonecrosis is stopped, the infection is cleared, and the mucosa heals and once again covers the bone.

The treatment the person receives depends on the severity of osteonecrosis of the jaw.

=== Conservative ===
Indicated in patients who have evidence of exposed bone but no evidence of infection. It may not necessarily eliminate all the lesions, but it may provide patients with long term relief. This approach involves a combination of antiseptic mouthwashes and analgesics and the use of teriparatide. Splints may be used to protect sites of exposed necrotic bone.

=== Non-surgical ===
Indicated for people with exposed bone with symptoms of infection. This treatment modality may also be utilised for patients with other co-morbidities which precludes invasive surgical methods. This approach requires antimicrobial mouthwashes, systemic antibiotics and antifungal medication and analgesics.

=== Surgery ===
Surgical intervention is indicated in patients with symptomatic exposed bone with fistula formation and one or more of the following: exposed and necrotic bone extending beyond the alveolar bone resulting in pathological fracture; extra-oral fistula; oral antral communication or osteolysis extending from the inferior border of the mandible or the sinus floor. Surgical management involves necrotic bone resection, removal of loose sequestra of necrotic bone and reconstructive surgery. The objective of surgical management is to eliminate areas of exposed bone to prevent the risk of further inflammation and infection. The amount of surgical debridement required remains controversial.

=== Other ===
- Ultrasonic therapy

=== Antibiotics ===
Antibiotics are used to treat cases involving infections. Penicillin is the first line of choice, although if this is contraindicated commonly used antimicrobials are: clindamycin, fluoroquinolones and/or metronidazole.

Intravenous antibiotics may be used if the infection resists oral treatment. However, there is little evidence of intravenous antibiotics being more efficacious than other methods of treatment.

== Epidemiology ==
The likelihood of this condition developing varies widely from less than 1/10,000 to 1/100, as many other factors need to be considered, such as the type, dose and frequency of intake of drug, how long it has been taken for, and why it has been taken.

In patients taking drugs for cancer, the likelihood of MRONJ development varies from 0 - 12%. This again, varies with the type of cancer, although prostate cancer and multiple myeloma are reported to be at a higher risk.

In patients taking oral drugs for osteoporosis, the likelihood of MRONJ development varies from 0 - 0.2%.

== See also ==
- C-terminal telopeptide, commonly known as CTX, a serum biomarker for bone turnover rate and a tool used to evaluate patient risk for complications due to BRONJ
- Osteonecrosis of the jaw, see section on Bisphosphonates
- Osteoradionecrosis, a term for osteonecrosis caused by radiotherapy
- Phossy jaw
