= Chiroscience =

UK biotechnology company

Chiroscience Group Plc
- Formerly: Chiros
- Traded as: formerly on the London Stock Exchange
- Founded: 1991; 34 years ago
- Founder: Andrew Richards; Peter Keen; Chris Evans
- Defunct: 1999
- Fate: Acquired by Celltech
- Key people: John Padfield CEO, 1996

Chiroscience Group Plc was a British-based biotech company, founded by Christopher Evans. The company was taken over by Celltech in 1999, which was acquired in 2004 by UCB.

== History ==
Chiroscience was born from the demise of the company Enzymatix, which was ultimately acquired by Genzyme, when Andrew Richards joined the company and convinced Evans and Peter Keen to launch Chiros, name of which was quickly revised to Chrioscience. Seed funding for the company of £3 million was provided by Schroder Ventures, Apax and 3i. Chiroscience became one of the first biotechnology Initial Public Offerings in the United Kingdom in 1994.

In 1996, the company merged with the American biotech company Darwin Molecular Corporation, based in Cambridge, Massachusetts, retaining Chiroscience as its name.

By the time of its merger with Celltech in 1999, both Chris Evans and Peter Keen had left the company, leaving Andrew Richards as the sole remaining founder and original board member.

== See also ==
- Chirocaine, an anesthetic developed by Chiroscience
- Romosozumab, discovered by Chiroscience before its acquisition by Celltech
- Pharmaceutical industry in the United Kingdom
