= Cavitation (disambiguation) =

Cavitation is the formation of vapour cavities in a liquid.

Cavitation may also refer to:

- Cavitation (embryology), a process in early embryonic development
- Cavitation (lung), an air pocket in the lung
- Cavitation (bone), an area of dead bone
- Cavitation (elastomers), the unstable expansion of a microscopic void in a solid elastomer under the action of tensile hydrostatic stresses
- Cavitation, a void in tissue resulting from penetrating trauma
