= Neuralgia-inducing cavitational osteonecrosis =

Medical condition

Neuralgia-inducing cavitational osteonecrosis (NICO) is a diagnosis whereby a putative jawbone cavitation causes chronic facial neuralgia; this is different from osteonecrosis of the jaw. In NICO the pain is said to result from the degenerating nerve ("neuralagia"). The condition is probably rare, if it does exist.

Also called Ratner's bone cavity, a neuralgia-inducing cavitational osteonecrosis was first described in dental literature by G V Black in 1920. Several decades later, oral pathologist Jerry E Bouquot took especial interest in NICO.

The diagnostic criteria for NICO are imprecise, and the research offered to support it is flawed. The diagnosis is popular among holistic dentists who attempt to treat NICO by surgically removing the dead bone they say is causing the pain.

It has been rejected as quackery by some dentists and maxillofacial surgeons. In its position statement, dated 1996, the American Association of Endodontists asserted that although NICO occur and are treatable in toothless areas, NICO occurrence and treatment at endodontically treated teeth is generally implausible, that the diagnosis ought to be a last resort, and that routine extraction of endodontically treated teeth is misguided.

== See also ==
- Atypical trigeminal neuralgia
- Health fraud
- Trigeminal neuralgia
