= Certolizumab pegol =

Pharmaceutical drug

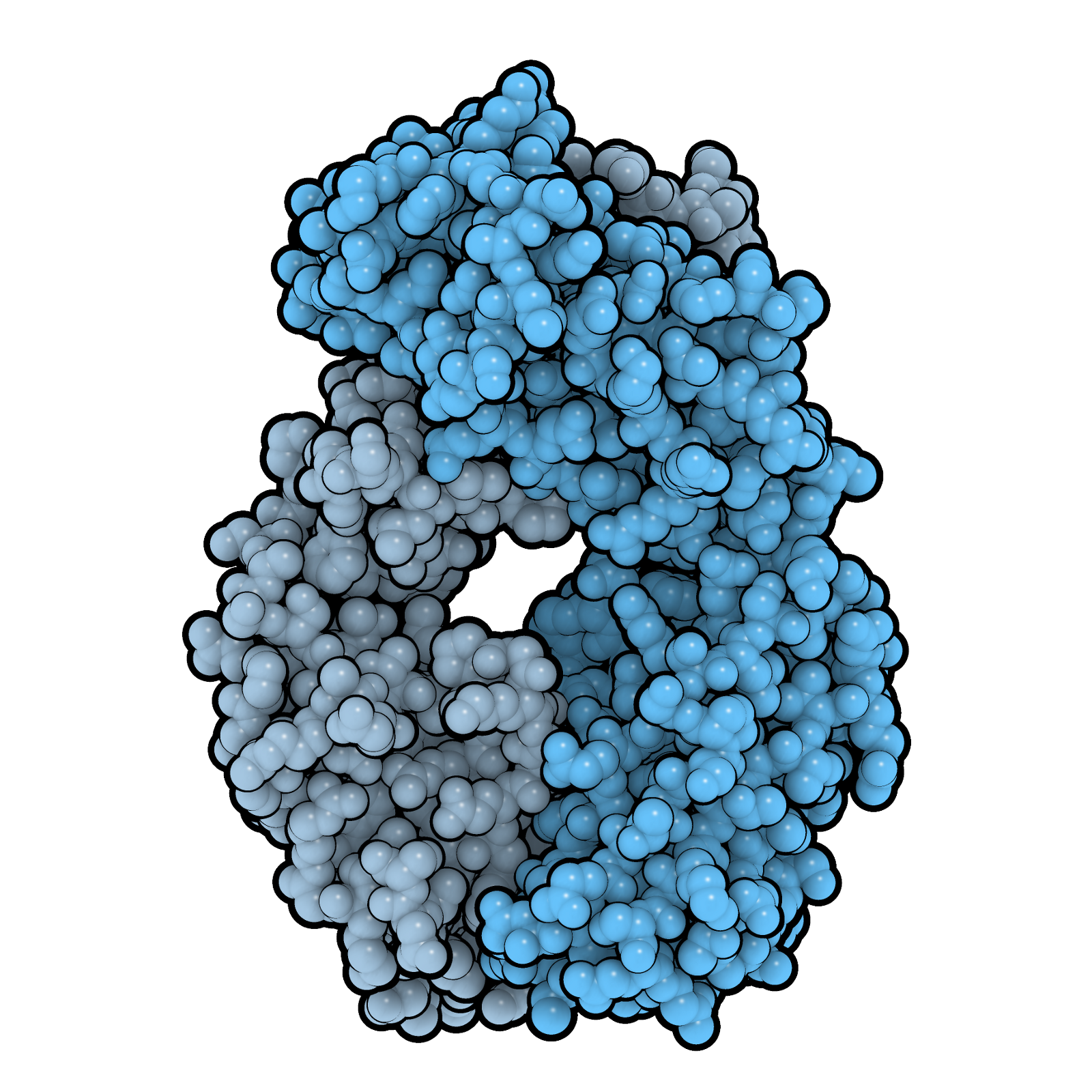

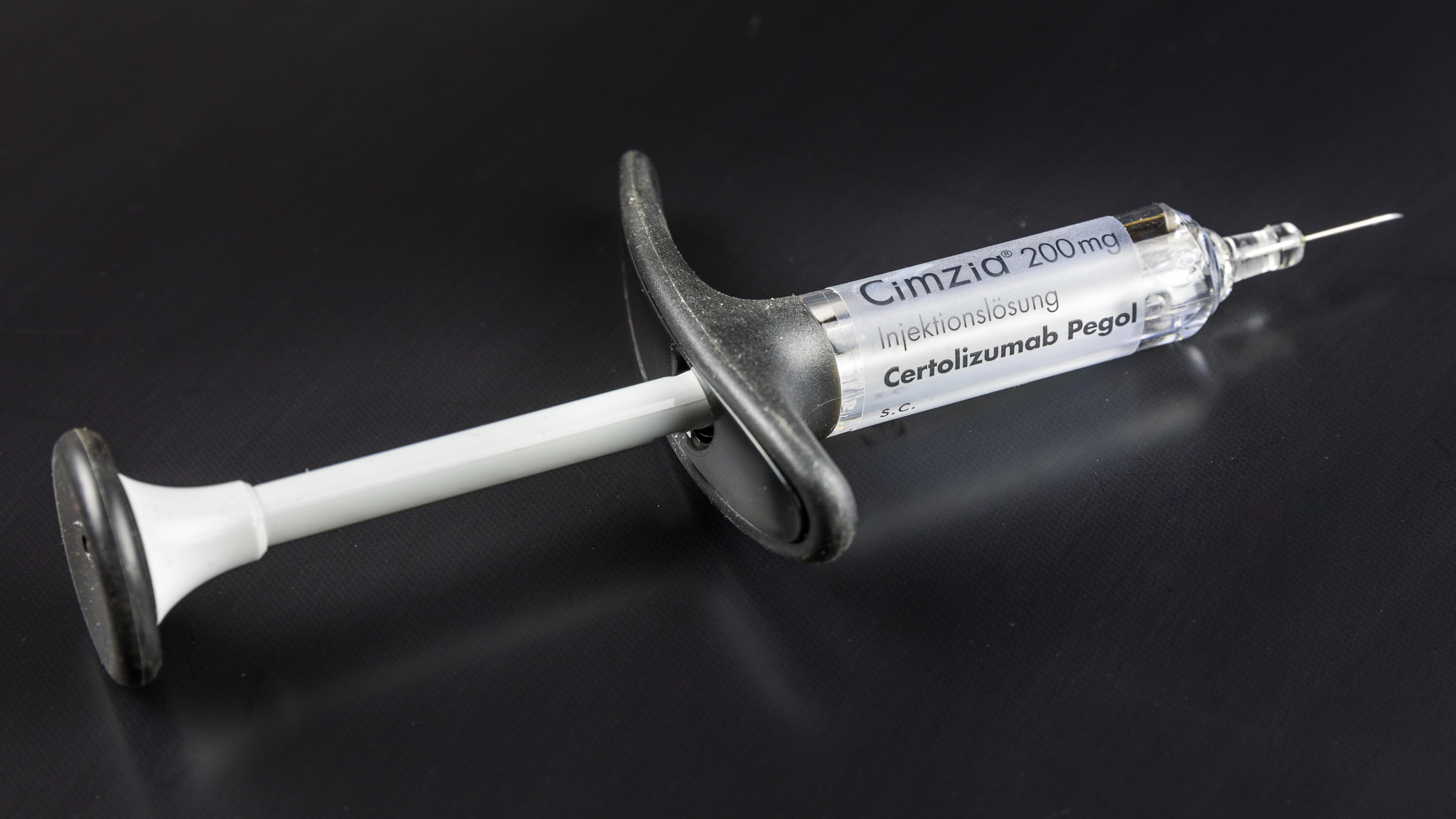
- Syringe with 200mg Certolizumab pegol

Monoclonal antibody
- Type: Fab' fragment
- Source: Humanized (from mouse)
- Target: TNF alpha

Clinical data
- Trade names: Cimzia
- Other names: CDP870
- AHFS/Drugs.com: Monograph
- MedlinePlus: a608041
- License data: US DailyMed: Certolizumab pegol
- Pregnancy category: AU: C
- Routes of administration: Subcutaneous
- ATC code: L04AB05 (WHO)

Legal status
- Legal status: AU: S4 (Prescription only); US: ℞-only; EU: Rx-only

Pharmacokinetic data
- Elimination half-life: about 11 days
- Excretion: Kidney (PEG only)

Identifiers
- CAS Number: 428863-50-7
- DrugBank: DB08904
- ChemSpider: none
- UNII: UMD07X179E
- KEGG: D03441
- ChEMBL: ChEMBL1201831

Chemical and physical data
- Formula: C_{2115}H_{3252}N_{556}O_{673}S_{16}
- Molar mass: 47749.46 g·mol^{−1}

Certolizumab pegol, sold under the brand name Cimzia, is a biopharmaceutical medication for the treatment of Crohn's disease, rheumatoid arthritis, psoriatic arthritis and ankylosing spondylitis. It is a fragment of a monoclonal antibody specific to tumor necrosis factor alpha (TNF-α) and is manufactured by UCB.

Certolizumab pegol is a therapeutic alternative on the World Health Organization's List of Essential Medicines.

== Medical uses ==
Crohn's Disease
On April 22, 2008, the U.S. Food and Drug Administration (FDA) approved Cimzia for the treatment of Crohn's disease in people who did not respond sufficiently or adequately to standard therapy.

Rheumatoid arthritis
On June 26, 2009, the Committee for Medicinal Products for Human Use (CHMP) of the European Medicines Agency (EMA) issued a positive opinion recommending that the European Commission grant a marketing authorisation for Cimzia for the treatment of rheumatoid arthritis only - the CHMP refused approval for the treatment of Crohn's disease. The marketing authorisation was granted to UCB Pharma SA in October 2009.

Psoriatic arthritis
On September 27, 2013, the U.S. FDA approved Cimzia for the treatment of adult patients with active psoriatic arthritis.

== Method of action ==
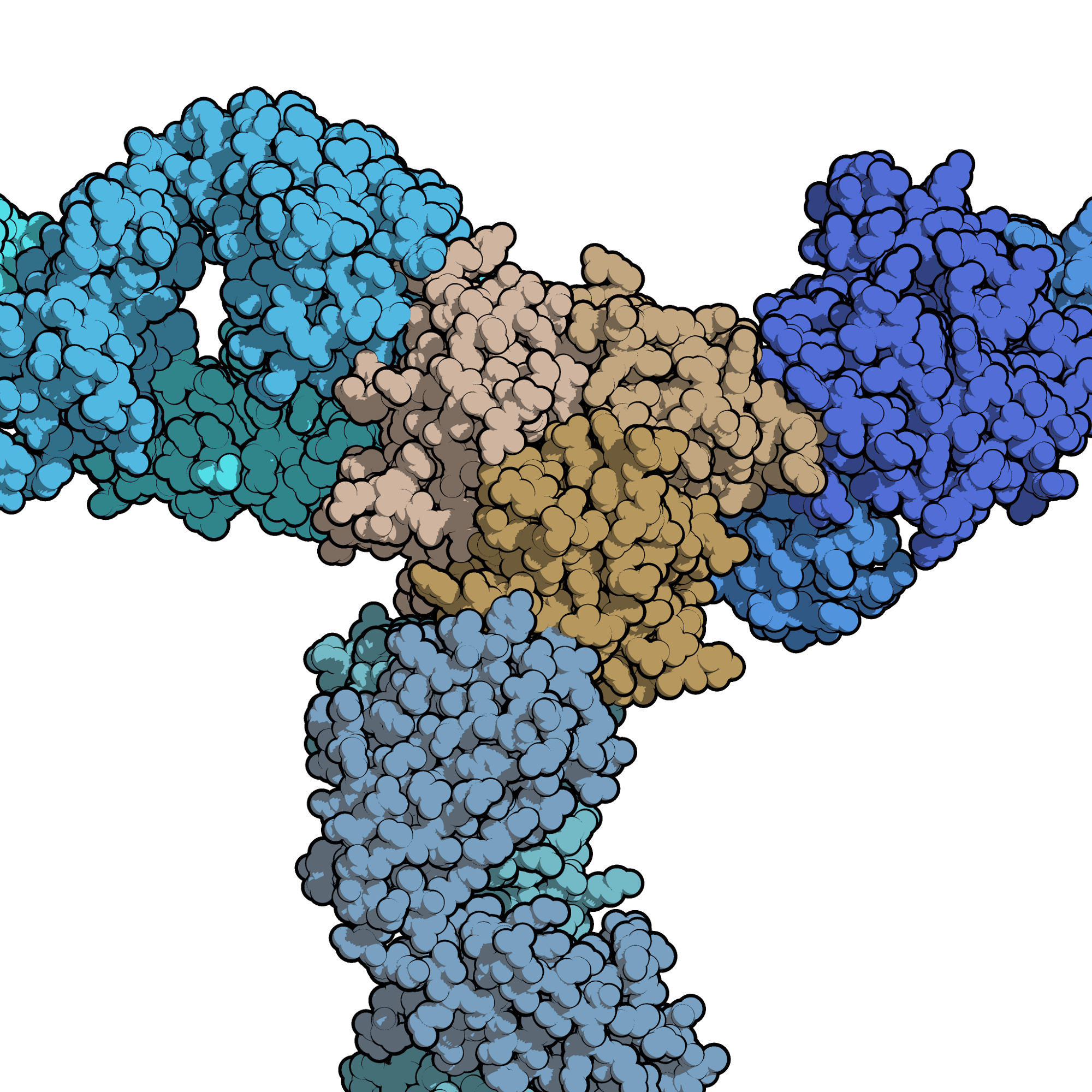
Three certolizumab molecules (blue) binding a homotrimer of TNF-alpha (tan). Certolizumab can block TNF in both its soluble form (freely circulating in the bloodstream) and its transmembrane form (bound to the membrane of a cell). From PDB: 5WUX.

Certolizumab pegol is a monoclonal antibody directed against tumor necrosis factor alpha. More precisely, it is a PEGylated Fab' fragment of a humanized TNF inhibitor monoclonal antibody.

== Clinical trials ==
Crohn's disease
Positive results have been demonstrated in two phase III trials (PRECiSE 1 and 2) of certolizumab pegol versus placebo in moderate to severe active Crohn's disease.

Axial spondyloarthritis
In 2013, a phase 3 double blind randomized placebo-controlled study found significantly positive results in patient self-reported questionnaires, with rapid improvement of function and pain reduction, in patients with axial spondyloarthritis.

Rheumatoid arthritis
Certolizumab appears beneficial in those with rheumatoid arthritis.
