= ReNeuron =

British stem cell research company

- Company type: Public company
- Traded as: LSE: RENE
- Industry: Stem cell research & development
- Founded: 1997
- Headquarters: Surrey, England, UK
- Key people: chairman = Trevor Jones
- Website: reneuron.com

ReNeuron is a UK-based stem cell research company whose shares were listed on the Alternative Investment Market, until it delisted in August 2024 after entering administration. Its focus is on the development of stem-cell therapies targeting areas of poorly-met medical need, including peripheral arterial disease, strokes, and retinal diseases.

As of 2010 ReNeuron was testing the effects of neural stem cells on spinal cords for neuroregeneration. They were also testing the use of fetal stem cells on stroke patients.
