= Celltech =

Former British-based biotechnology firm

Celltech Group
- Company type: Public
- Industry: Biotechnology
- Founded: 1980
- Defunct: 2004
- Fate: Acquired
- Successor: UCB
- Headquarters: Slough, UK
- Key people: Goran Ando (CEO)

Celltech Group plc was a leading British-based biotechnology business based in Slough. It was listed on the London Stock Exchange and was a constituent of the FTSE 100 Index. Celltech was instrumental in changing the UK's system of technology transfer from research to business, and in creating the biotechnology industry.

== History ==
Celltech was formed in 1980 in response to the concern that Britain was failing to commercialise its science and was missing out on the potential of the new biotechnology. There was especial concern that whereas US firms had been creating rapidly growing firms such as Genentech around scientific discoveries in biotechnology, the UK had missed opportunities such as that believed to be provided by the Nobel Prize-winning discovery of the production technique for Monoclonal antibody by Cesar Milstein and Georges Kohler at Cambridge University.

The creation of Celltech was complicated, involving the National Enterprise Board, the National Research Development Corporation, and the Medical Research Council. The decision was made to give Celltech exclusive rights to all biotechnology discoveries in UK research institutions and universities. Although the company was conceived under a Labour Government it was born under a Conservative government, with the Minister responsible, Sir Keith Joseph, being particularly averse to government intervention in industry. As a result, he ensured the company was majority owned by the private sector. The company thus began life with very high expectations: first, that a small start up could successfully commercialise the UK's scientific output in biotechnology, and second, that it could meet the profit expectations of private sector investors.

Celltech's founding CEO was Gerard Fairtlough, who worked in the National Enterprise Board and saw the opportunities presented by biotechnology. He created the plan for Celltech and when the Board was created, it believed he was the best person to lead it. Fairtlough was an inspirational leader with innovative ideas on organisation. In the decade that Fairtlough led Celltech, he not only helped found a significant scientific endeavour whose example led to improved ambition and ability to commercialise UK research, but introduced a new way of organising high technology firms.

In 1999 Celltech led consolidation in the UK biosciences market merging with Chiroscience plc, after which it was briefly referred to as Celltech Chiroscience, and then buying Medeva plc. Then in 2000 it bought Cistron, a US biosciences business. It expanded into Germany in 2001 buying Thiemann, a German biosciences business, and went on to buy Oxford Glycosciences in July 2003 for £102m. Celltech was acquired by UCB, a Belgian drugmaker, in 2004.

== Operations ==
The company was engaged in research and development of therapies for patients with serious diseases. Products included:

- Tussionex for coughs
- Zaroxolyn for resistant edema
- Methylphenidate for ADHD
- Amphetamine for ADHD and narcolepsy, as 5 mg Dexedrine tablets
- Semprex-D, an antihistamine and decongestant
- Inotuzumab ozogamicin and gemtuzumab ozogamicin, both through Celltech's collaboration with Wyeth.

Amongst the work conducted at Celltech was the cloning of the glutamine synthetase (GS) gene in CHO cells leading to the creation of a biotechnology tool still widely used to express recombinant eukaryotic proteins.

== Notable alumni ==
in 2025 Mary Brunkow and Fred Ramsdell were among the three recipients of the Nobel Prize in Physiology or Medicine for work on a mutation in the FOXP3 gene which affects Regulatory T cells, and their role in autoimmune diseases such as Type 1 diabetes. The citation from the Nobel Institute states that the prize was awarded for "their discoveries concerning peripheral immune tolerance." The pair performed this research at the Bothell, WA Celltech laboratory.

== See also ==
- Pharmaceutical industry in the United Kingdom
