= UCB (company) =

Biopharmaceutical company

UCB S.A.
- Type: Société anonyme
- Traded as: Euronext Brussels: UCB; BEL 20 component
- Industry: Pharmaceuticals
- Predecessor: Compagnie Continentale du Pégamoïd; Union des Fabriques Belges de Textiles Artificiels
- Founded: 1928
- Founder: Emmanuel Janssen
- Headquarters: Brussels, Belgium
- Key people: Gerhard Mayr (Chairman), Jean Christophe Tellier (CEO)
- Products: Biopharmaceuticals
- Revenue: € 5.777 billion (2021)
- Operating income: € 1.109 billion (2018)
- Net income: € 0.823 billion (2018)
- Total assets: 18,158,000,000 euro (2025)
- Number of employees: 7,600 (2020)
- Website: www.ucb.com

UCB (Union Chimique Belge) is a multinational biopharmaceutical company headquartered in Brussels, Belgium. UCB is an international company with revenue of €4.178 billion in 2016 which focuses primarily on research and development, specifically involving medications centered on epilepsy, Parkinson's disease, and Crohn's disease. The company's efforts are focused on treatments for severe diseases treated by specialists, particularly in the fields of central nervous system (CNS) disorders (including epilepsy), inflammatory disorders (including allergy), and oncology.

Every three years, the company presents the UCB Award under the patronage of the Queen Elisabeth Medical Foundation to promote neuroscience research. The winner of this award is selected by an independent scientific committee.

== History ==
UCB was founded on 18 January 1928 by Emmanuel Janssen, a Belgian businessman. Initially focused on industrial chemicals (it was one of the first companies to distill ammonia from coal), the company also included a small pharmaceutical division based around Meurice Laboratories.

In the early 1950s, UCB set up a research centre where new medicines such as Atarax (hydroxyzine) were developed. Successful sales enabled the pharmaceutical division to expand, and led to the discovery of another important compound, called piracetam. This was marketed in the 1970s as Nootropil and used to treat memory and balance problems. It remains one of UCB's key products. At this time, UCB was a company focusing on three core areas: pharmaceuticals, chemicals and films.

The success of Nootropil made it possible for UCB to build a modern pharmaceutical site in Braine-l'Alleud, south of Brussels. There, UCB developed Zyrtec (cetirizine), a blockbuster antihistamine. Other important products have followed, including Keppra (levetiracetam), Xyzal (levocetirizine), and Cimzia (certolizumab pegol), which arrived through the acquisition of Celltech.

At the end of 2002, the chemicals and films divisions were merged and UCB added the resins, additives and adhesives activities of Solutia to form the surface specialties division. The films part was then sold to Innovia Films in September 2004. The chemicals division methylamines and derivatives was spun off and later sold to form the company Taminco.

In May 2004, UCB acquired the British biotechnology company Celltech, followed in March 2005 by the sale of the surface specialties to Cytec Industries. By divesting all of its non-pharmaceutical activities and acquiring Celltech (for $1 billion), UCB transformed itself into a global biopharmaceutical company.

In 2006, UCB started the purchase of the German pharmaceutical company Schwarz for €4 billion. As of July 2007, UCB holds approximately 87% of Schwarz's outstanding shares. The purchase of Schwarz enabled UCB to introduce two new drugs against CNS disorders: Neupro (rotigotine), a transdermal patch for treatment of Parkinson's disease, and Vimpat (lacosamide), an anticonvulsant. Another drug in the Schwarz portfolio, Toviaz (fesoterodine), a compound to treat overactive bladder, was licensed to Pfizer in 2006.

In 2008, UCB established a multi-year collaboration with Beryllium, a developer of treatments for immune and CNS disorders. By 2014, this collaboration had yielded "significant scientific breakthroughs", which led to UCB acquiring a minority stake in the company.

In 2015, UCB announced the sale of its branded generics business in India and South Asia to Dr. Reddy's Laboratories for INR 8 billion ($128.38 million). In September of the same year, the company offloaded its generics subsidiary (Kremers Urban Pharmaceuticals) to Lannett for $1.23 billion.

In October 2019 UCB announced that it would acquire immune system disease specialist Ra Pharma for $2.1 billion. On April 2, 2020, UCB announced that the acquisition has been successfully completed.

In January 2022, the company announced it would acquire Zogenix for $1.9 billion ($26 per share).

== Notable drugs developed by UCB ==
- Atarax (hydroxyzine)
- Bimzelx (bimekizumab)
- Briviact (Brivaracetam)
- Nootropil (piracetam)
- Zyrtec (cetirizine), an OTC antihistamine
- Keppra (levetiracetam), an anticonvulsant medication used to treat epilepsy
- Xyzal (levocetirizine), a third-generation non-sedative antihistamine
- Cimzia (certolizumab pegol), a monoclonal antibody to TNF-α for the treatment of Crohn's disease and rheumatoid arthritis
- Neupro (rotigotine), a transdermal patch for treatment of Parkinson's disease
- Vimpat (lacosamide), an anticonvulsant
- Atamet (carbidopa/levodopa) for Parkinson's disease
- Nayzilam (midazolam) for Seizure Clusters

== Corporate governance ==
Jean-Christophe Tellier became the CEO of UCB in January 2015. He was succeeding Roch Doliveux, who was the CEO from 2004 until December 2014.

== Operations ==
UCB has operations in over 40 countries and employs more than 7500 people. The United States specialty generics subsidiary was Kremers Urban Pharmaceuticals, established in 1904 and based in Princeton, New Jersey. By November 2015, Lannett Company had acquired Kremers for US$1,230,000,000.

== Scandals ==
In 2004, UCB was fined €10.4 million by the EU for its involvement in a vitamin B4 price fixing cartel. In 2011, UCB was fined $34 million in the US for fraud arising from the mispromotion of Keppra for migraines, despite company research showing it was ineffective for this purpose. In 2015, UCB was investigated by Chinese authorities for corruption and bribery.
