= Cavitation (bone) =

Area of dead or dying bone

Cavitations are an area of dead or dying bone. They are caused by infections, physical trauma, or a dearth of blood flow to that part of the bone.

There is little evidence to support the theory of cavitation in the jawbone, and their diagnosis is highly controversial. Proponents claim they primarily affect the jawbone, yet that cavitations are able to affect any bone. Jawbone cavitations, also called neuralgia-inducing cavitational osteonecrosis (NICO) if they are associated with pain, might be extraction sites in the jaw that have not healed.
