= Cathepsin Z =

Protein-coding gene in the species Homo sapiens

CTSZ
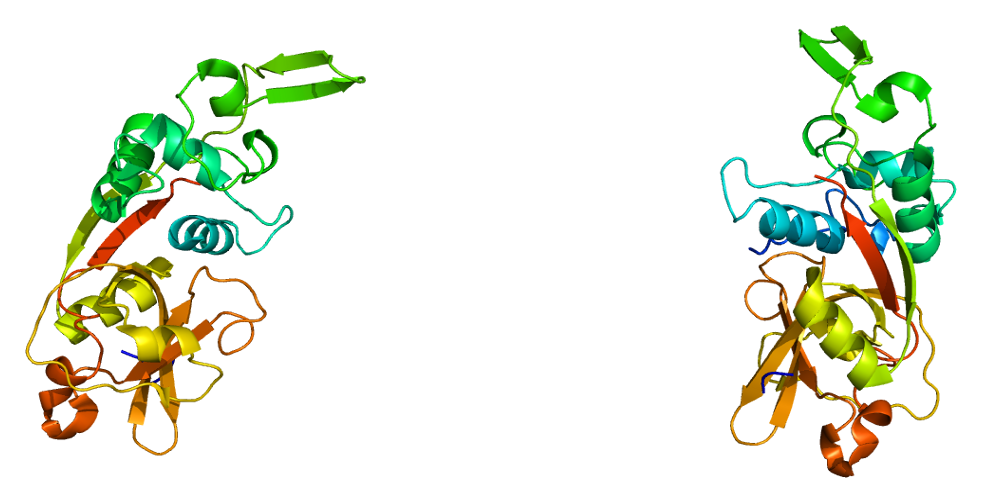

Identifiers
- Aliases: CTSZ, CTSX, cathepsin Z
- External IDs: OMIM: 603169; MGI: 1891190; GeneCards: CTSZ
Available structures
PDB	Ortholog search: PDBe RCSB
PDB	List of PDB id codes 1DEU, 1EF7
Enzyme activity
EC #	BRENDA	ExPASy	KEGG	MetaCyc
3.4.18.1	↗	↗	↗	↗

Gene location (Human)
Chr.	Chromosome 20 (human)
Band	20q13.32	Start	58,985,686 bp
Band	20q13.32	End	59,008,238 bp

Gene location (Mouse)
Chr.	Chromosome 2 (mouse)
Band	2 H4|2 97.94 cM	Start	174,269,286 bp
Band	2 H4|2 97.94 cM	End	174,280,832 bp
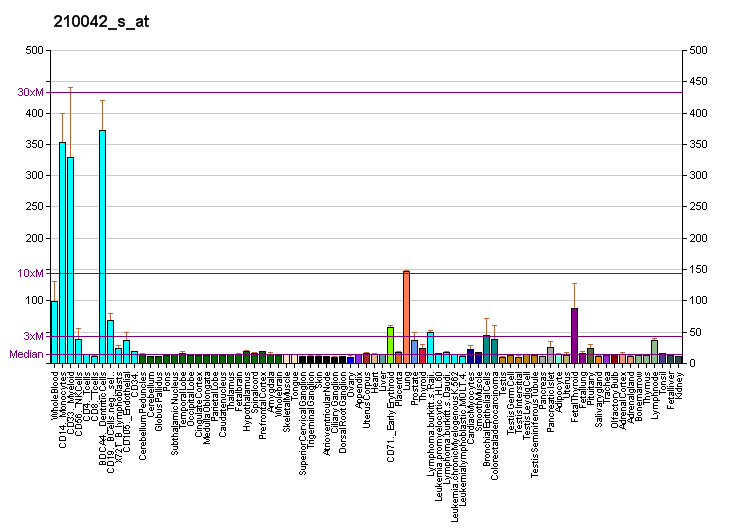
RNA expression pattern
Bgee	Human / Mouse (ortholog); Top expressed in: monocyte; granulocyte; mucosa of transverse colon; right coronary artery; ascending aorta; Descending thoracic aorta; rectum; upper lobe of left lung; right lobe of liver; right lung / Top expressed in: stroma of bone marrow; yolk sac; dermis; left lung lobe; migratory enteric neural crest cell; calvaria; decidua; supraoptic nucleus; parotid gland; efferent ductule; More reference expression data
BioGPS	More reference expression data
Gene ontology
Molecular function	protein binding; peptidase activity; hydrolase activity; cysteine-type endopeptidase activity; cysteine-type peptidase activity; carboxypeptidase activity
Cellular component	endoplasmic reticulum lumen; COPII-coated ER to Golgi transport vesicle; intracellular membrane-bounded organelle; endoplasmic reticulum; plasma membrane; endoplasmic reticulum-Golgi intermediate compartment membrane; extracellular exosome; Golgi membrane; extracellular region; specific granule lumen; ficolin-1-rich granule lumen; extracellular space; lysosome; cell surface; growth cone; cytoplasmic vesicle; cell cortex region; collagen-containing extracellular matrix
Biological process	proteolysis involved in cellular protein catabolic process; COPII vesicle coating; endoplasmic reticulum to Golgi vesicle-mediated transport; epithelial tube branching involved in lung morphogenesis; angiotensin maturation; neutrophil degranulation; proteolysis; negative regulation of plasminogen activation; negative regulation of neuron projection development; negative regulation of protein binding; positive regulation of neuron apoptotic process; regulation of neuron death; positive regulation of neural precursor cell proliferation
Sources:Amigo / QuickGO
Orthologs
Databases	NCBI: entry; OMA: entry
Species	Human	Mouse
Entrez	1522	64138
Ensembl	ENSG00000101160	ENSMUSG00000016256
UniProt	Q9UBR2	Q9WUU7
RefSeq (mRNA)	NM_001336	NM_022325
RefSeq (protein)	NP_001327	NP_071720
Location (UCSC)	Chr 20: 58.99 – 59.01 Mb	Chr 2: 174.27 – 174.28 Mb
PubMed search
- Wikidata
View/Edit Human	View/Edit Mouse

Cathepsin Z, also called cathepsin X or cathepsin P, is a protein that in humans is encoded by the CTSZ gene. It is a member of the cysteine cathepsin family of cysteine proteases, which has 11 members. As one of the 11 cathepsins, cathepsin Z contains distinctive features from others. Cathepsin Z has been reported involved in cancer malignancy and inflammation.

== Structure ==
=== Gene ===
The CTSZ gene is located at 20q13.32 on chromosome 20, consisting of 6 exons. At least two transcript variants of this gene have been found, but the full-length nature of only one of them has been determined.

=== Protein ===
Cathepsin Z is characterized by an unusual and unique 3-amino acid insertion in the highly conserved region between the glutamine of the putative oxynion hole and the active site cysteine. The pro-region of cathepsin Z shares no significant similarity with other cathepsin family sequences. It contains only 41 amino acid residues without the conserved motif of ERFNIN or GNFD found in other cysteine proteinases. Besides, the proregion sequence contains no lysine residue.

== Function ==
The protein encoded by this gene is a lysosomal cysteine proteinase and member of the peptidase C1 family. It exhibits both carboxy-monopeptidase and carboxy-dipeptidase activities. Up to date, eleven human cysteine proteinases have been identified, including cathepsin B, cathepsin C, cathepsin F, cathepsin H, cathepsin K, cathepsin L, cathepsin L2 or V, cathepsin O, cathepsin S, cathepsin Z, and cathepsin W. These cysteine proteinases belong to the papain family and represent a major component of the lysosomal proteolytic system. In addition to playing a critical role in protein degradation and turnover, these proteinases appear to play an extracellular role in a number of normal and pathological conditions. The human cathepsin Z contains distinctive features from other human cysteine proteases. It is an exopeptidase with strict carboxypeptidase activity, while most other cathepsins are endopeptidases. Cathepsin Z has an exposed integrin-binding Arg-Gly-Asp motif within the propeptide of the enzyme, through which cathepsin Z has been shown to interact with several integrins during normal homeostasis, immune processes and cancer. It is also shown to bind cell surface heparin sulphate proteoglycans, indicating possible functions in cellular adhesion and phagocytosis.

== Clinical significance ==
This gene is expressed ubiquitously in cancer cell lines and primary tumors and, like other members of this family, may be involved in tumorigenesis. For instance, cathepsin Z promotes invasion and migration via a noncatalytic mechanism, suggesting multiple modes of cell invasion may be involved in cancer malignancy. Cathepsin Z is also reported to have a protective, but not proteolytic, function in inflammatory gastric disease. It is reported in another study that cathepsin Z may be responsible for dopamine neuron death and thus involved in the pathogenic cascade event. Single-nucleotide polymorphism in CTSZ is found associated with tuberculosis susceptibility, indicating that the pathways involving this protein could yield novel therapies for tuberculosis.

== Interactions ==
Cathepsin Z has been shown to interact with the following proteins: CEP55, FBXO6, KIFC1, KRT40, KRTAP5-9, KRTAP5-9, LYPLAL1, MID2, MSN, MTUS2, NOTCH2NL, PLK2, PLSCR1, SGOL2, and SPRED2.

Cathepsin Z has also been found to interact with:

- Integrin,
- PRLP0, and
- γ-Enolase.
