= Papain =

Widely used enzyme extracted from papayas

Papain family cysteine protease
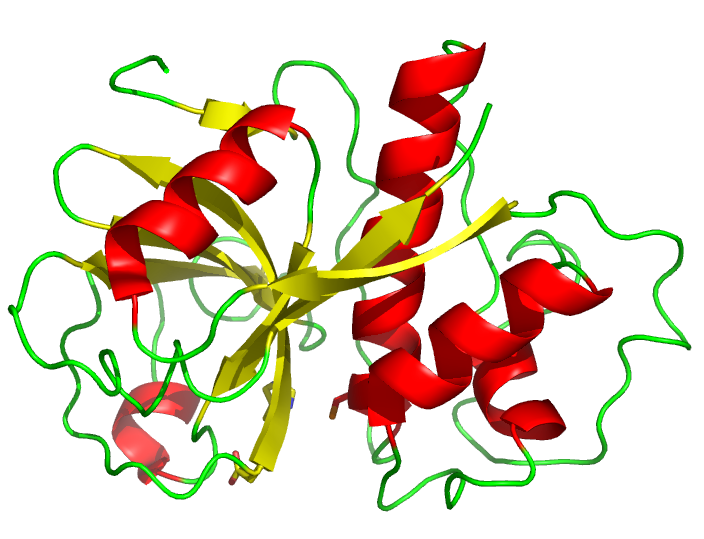
- Papain from Carica papaya

Identifiers
- Symbol: Peptidase_C1
- Pfam: PF00112
- InterPro: IPR000668
- PROSITE: PDOC00126
- SCOP2: 1aec / SCOPe / SUPFAM
Available protein structures:
- PDB: IPR000668 PF00112 (ECOD; PDBsum)
- AlphaFold: IPR000668; PF00112

papain

Identifiers
- EC no.: 3.4.22.2
- CAS no.: 9001-73-4

Databases
- BRENDA: enzyme data
- ExPASy: NiceZyme view
- KEGG: enzyme entry
- MetaCyc: metabolic pathway
- Rhea: reactions
- PDB structures: RCSB PDB PDBe PDBsum
Search
- PMC: articles
- PubMed: articles
- NCBI: proteins

Papain, also known as papaya proteinase I, is a cysteine protease (EC 3.4.22.2) enzyme present in papaya (Carica papaya) and mountain papaya (Vasconcellea cundinamarcensis). It is the namesake member of the papain-like protease family.

It has wide ranging commercial applications in the leather, cosmetic, textiles, detergents, food and pharmaceutical industries. In the food industry, papain is used as an active ingredient in many commercial meat tenderizers.

== Papain family ==
Papain belongs to a family of related proteins, known as the papain-like protease family, with a wide variety of activities, including endopeptidases, aminopeptidases, dipeptidyl peptidases and enzymes with both exo- and endopeptidase activity. Members of the papain family are widespread, found in baculoviruses, eubacteria, yeast, and practically all protozoa, plants and mammals. The proteins are typically lysosomal or secreted, and proteolytic cleavage of the propeptide is required for enzyme activation, although bleomycin hydrolase is cytosolic in fungi and mammals. Papain-like cysteine proteinases are essentially synthesised as inactive proenzymes (zymogens) with N-terminal propeptide regions. The activation process of these enzymes includes the removal of propeptide regions, which serve a variety of functions in vivo and in vitro. The pro-region is required for the proper folding of the newly synthesised enzyme, the inactivation of the peptidase domain and stabilisation of the enzyme against denaturing at neutral to alkaline pH conditions. Amino acid residues within the pro-region mediate their membrane association, and play a role in the transport of the proenzyme to lysosomes. Among the most notable features of propeptides is their ability to inhibit the activity of their cognate enzymes and that certain propeptides exhibit high selectivity for inhibition of the peptidases from which they originate.

== Structure ==
The papain precursor protein contains 345 amino acid residues, and consists of a signal sequence (1-18), a propeptide (19-133) and the mature peptide (134-345). The amino acid numbers are based on the mature peptide. The protein is stabilised by three disulfide bridges. Its three-dimensional structure consists of two distinct structural domains with a cleft between them. This cleft contains the active site, which contains a catalytic dyad that has been likened to the catalytic triad of chymotrypsin. The catalytic dyad is made up of the amino acids cysteine-25 (from which it gets its classification) and histidine-159. Aspartate-158 was thought to play a role analogous to the role of aspartate in the serine protease catalytic triad, but that has since been disproved.

== Function ==
The mechanism by which papain breaks peptide bonds involves the use of a catalytic dyad with a deprotonated cysteine. A nearby Asn-175 helps to orient the imidazole ring of His-159 to allow it to deprotonate the catalytic Cys-25. This cysteine then performs a nucleophilic attack on the carbonyl carbon of a peptide backbone. This forms a covalent acyl-enzyme intermediate and frees the amino terminus of the peptide. The enzyme is deacylated by a water molecule and releases the carboxy terminal portion of the peptide. In immunology, papain is known to cleave the Fc (crystallisable) portion of immunoglobulins (antibodies) from the Fab (antigen-binding) portion.

Papain is a relatively heat-resistant enzyme, with an optimal temperature range of 60 to 70 °C.

Papain prefers to cleave after an arginine or lysine preceded by a hydrophobic unit (Ala, Val, Leu, Ile, Phe, Trp, Tyr) and not followed by a valine.

== Uses ==
Anthelmintic effect of papain on the worm Heligmosomoides bakeri.

Papain breaks down tough meat fibres, and was used before European contact to tenderise meat eaten in its native South America. Meat tenderisers in powder form with papain as an active component are widely sold and the culinary use of papaya peel has been featured in research papers.

Papain can be used to dissociate cells in the first step of cell culture preparations. A ten-minute treatment of small tissue pieces (less than 1 mm^{3}) will allow papain to begin cleaving the extracellular matrix molecules holding the cells together. After ten minutes, the tissue should be treated with a protease inhibitor solution to stop the protease action. Left untreated, papain activity will lead to complete lysis of the cells. The tissue must then be triturated (passed quickly up and down through a Pasteur pipette) to break up the pieces of tissue into a single cell suspension.

It is also used as an ingredient in various enzymatic debriding preparations, notably Accuzyme. These are used in the care of some chronic wounds to clean up dead tissue.

Papain is added to some toothpastes and mint sweets as a tooth whitener. Its whitening effect is minimal, because the papain is present in low concentrations and is quickly diluted by saliva. It would take several months of use to have a noticeable effect.

Papain is the main ingredient of Papacarie, a gel used for chemomechanical dental caries removal. It does not require drilling and does not interfere in the bond strength of restorative materials to dentin.

Papain has been known to interfere with urine drug tests for cannabinoids. It is found in some drug detox products.

Recently, it has been demonstrated that papain can be used to assemble thin films of titania used in photovoltaic cells.

Papain has also been used to create a degenerated disc disease model to assess various types of injectable therapies.

== Immunoglobulins ==
The papain-digested antibody: two Fab fragments and an Fc fragment.

An antibody digested by papain yields three fragments: two 50 kDa Fab fragments and one 50 kDa Fc fragment. The papain-digested antibody is unable to promote agglutination, precipitation, opsonization, and lysis, however, the Fab fragment is still able to bind to and neutralize appropriate antigens, most commonly seen in the use of sheep anti-Crotalid toxin antibody preparations, known as CroFab and in Digibind, a similar sheep antiserum fragment, used to neutralize the cardiac medication digoxin in acute overdose situations.

== Production ==
Papain is usually produced as a crude, dried material by collecting the latex from the fruit of the papaya tree. The latex is collected after scoring the neck of the fruit, where it may either dry on the fruit or drip into a container. This latex is then further dried. It is now classified as a dried, crude material. A purification step is necessary to remove contaminating substances. This purification consists of the solubilization and extraction of the active papain enzyme system through a government-registered process. This purified papain may be supplied as powder or as liquid.

== US restriction on marketing ==
On September 23, 2008, the US Food and Drug Administration (FDA) warned companies to stop marketing ophthalmic balanced salt solutions and topical drug products containing papain by November 4, 2008. The FDA said, "Papain-containing drug products in topical form historically have been marketed without approval...". According to the FDA's statement on the subject, "These unapproved products have put consumers' health in jeopardy, from reports of permanent vision loss with unapproved balanced salt solutions to a serious drop in blood pressure and increased heart rate from the topical papain products," said Janet Woodcock, director for the Center for Drug Evaluation and Research.

=== Unapproved topical papain products ===
Topical drug ointments containing papain are used to remove dead or contaminated tissue in acute and chronic lesions, such as diabetic ulcers, pressure ulcers, varicose ulcers, and traumatic infected wounds. Trade names for these products include Accuzyme, Allanfil, Allanzyme, Ethezyme, Gladase, Kovia, Panafil, Pap Urea, and Ziox. Other products are marketed under the names of the active ingredients, for instance, papain-urea ointment.

In 2008 the FDA announced its intention to take action against these products because it had received reports of serious adverse events in patients using products containing papain. Reports included hypersensitivity (allergic) reactions that lead to hypotension (low blood pressure) and tachycardia (rapid heart rate). In addition, people allergic to latex can also be allergic to papaya, the source of papain, implying that people with latex sensitivity may be at increased risk of suffering an adverse reaction to a topical papain drug product.

FDA recommended that people with concerns about using topical papain preparations contact their health care provider about discontinuing use.

== Human cysteine proteases from papain family ==
- CTSB
- CTSC
- CTSF
- CTSH
- CTSK
- CTSL1
- CTSL2
- CTSL3
- CTSO
- CTSS
- CTSW
- CTSZ

== See also ==
- Bromelain
