= CTSL =

CTSL may refer to:

- Canadian Tire Services Ltd.
- Cathepsin L1, an enzyme encoded by the gene CTSL
- Central Taurus Sign Language

== See also ==
- Cathepsin L2, an enzyme encoded by the gene CTSV
