= Cathepsin X =

Identifiers
- EC no.: 3.4.18.1
- CAS no.: 37217-21-3

Databases
- BRENDA: enzyme data
- ExPASy: NiceZyme view
- KEGG: enzyme entry
- MetaCyc: metabolic pathway
- Rhea: reactions
- PDB structures: RCSB PDB PDBe PDBsum
Search
- PMC: articles
- PubMed: articles
- NCBI: proteins

Cathepsin X (EC 3.4.18.1, cathepsin B2, cysteine-type carboxypeptidase, cathepsin IV, cathepsin Z, acid carboxypeptidase, lysosomal carboxypeptidase B) is an enzyme. This enzyme catalyses the following chemical reaction

Release of C-terminal amino acid residues with broad specificity, but lacks action on C-terminal proline. Shows weak endopeptidase activity

Cathepsin X is a cysteine cathepsin, a lysosomal cysteine peptidase of family C1 (papain family).

== See also ==
- Cathepsin Z
