= PCDHGA11 =

Protein-coding gene in the species Homo sapiens

Identifiers
- Aliases: PCDHGA11, PCDH-GAMMA-A11, protocadherin gamma subfamily A, 11
- External IDs: OMIM: 606298; MGI: 1935228; GeneCards: PCDHGA11

Gene location (Human)
Chr.	Chromosome 5 (human)
Band	5q31.3	Start	141,421,047 bp
Band	5q31.3	End	141,512,975 bp

Gene location (Mouse)
Chr.	Chromosome 18 (mouse)
Band	18|18 B3	Start	37,888,784 bp
Band	18|18 B3	End	37,974,926 bp
RNA expression pattern
Bgee	Human / Mouse (ortholog); Top expressed in: testicle; stromal cell of endometrium; ventricular zone; ganglionic eminence; Achilles tendon; sural nerve; apex of heart; left ventricle; right coronary artery; Descending thoracic aorta / Top expressed in: ganglionic eminence; olfactory bulb; hippocampus proper; striatum of neuraxis; mesencephalon; rhombencephalon; neural tube; cerebellum; dentate gyrus of hippocampal formation granule cell; ventricular zone; More reference expression data
BioGPS	n/a
Gene ontology
Molecular function	calcium ion binding
Cellular component	integral component of membrane; plasma membrane; membrane; integral component of plasma membrane
Biological process	homophilic cell adhesion via plasma membrane adhesion molecules; cell adhesion; cell-cell signaling; nervous system development
Sources:Amigo / QuickGO
Orthologs
Databases	NCBI: entry; OMA: entry
Species	Human	Mouse
Entrez	56105	93723
Ensembl	ENSG00000253873	ENSMUSG00000102742
UniProt	Q9Y5H2	Q91XY8
RefSeq (mRNA)	NM_032092; NM_018914; NM_032091	NM_033594
RefSeq (protein)	NP_061737; NP_114480; NP_114481	NP_291072
Location (UCSC)	Chr 5: 141.42 – 141.51 Mb	Chr 18: 37.89 – 37.97 Mb
PubMed search
- Wikidata
View/Edit Human	View/Edit Mouse

Protocadherin gamma-A11 is a protein that in humans is encoded by the PCDHGA11 gene.

This gene is a member of the protocadherin gamma gene cluster, one of three related clusters tandemly linked on chromosome 5. These gene clusters have an immunoglobulin-like organization, suggesting that a novel mechanism may be involved in their regulation and expression.

The gamma gene cluster includes 22 genes divided into 3 subfamilies. Subfamily A contains 12 genes, subfamily B contains 7 genes and 2 pseudogenes, and the more distantly related subfamily C contains 3 genes. The tandem array of 22 large, variable region exons are followed by a constant region, containing 3 exons shared by all genes in the cluster. Each variable region exon encodes the extracellular region, which includes 6 cadherin ectodomains and a transmembrane region. The constant region exons encode the common cytoplasmic region.

These neural cadherin-like cell adhesion proteins most likely play a critical role in the establishment and function of specific cell-cell connections in the brain. Alternative splicing has been described for the gamma cluster genes.
