= V-cath endopeptidase =

Class of enzymes

Identifiers
- EC no.: 3.4.22.50
- CAS no.: 316365-69-2

Databases
- BRENDA: enzyme data
- ExPASy: NiceZyme view
- KEGG: enzyme entry
- MetaCyc: metabolic pathway
- Rhea: reactions
- PDB structures: RCSB PDB PDBe PDBsum
Search
- PMC: articles
- PubMed: articles
- NCBI: proteins

V-cath endopeptidase (EC 3.4.22.50, AcNPV protease, BmNPV protease, NPV protease, baculovirus cathepsin, nucleopolyhedrosis virus protease, viral cathepsin) is an enzyme. This enzyme catalyses the following chemical reaction

Endopeptidase of broad specificity, hydrolyzing substrates of both cathepsin L and cathepsin B

This enzyme belongs to the peptidase family C1.
