= Nidoviral papain-like protease =

Papain-like protease protein domain

Coronavirus papain-like peptidase
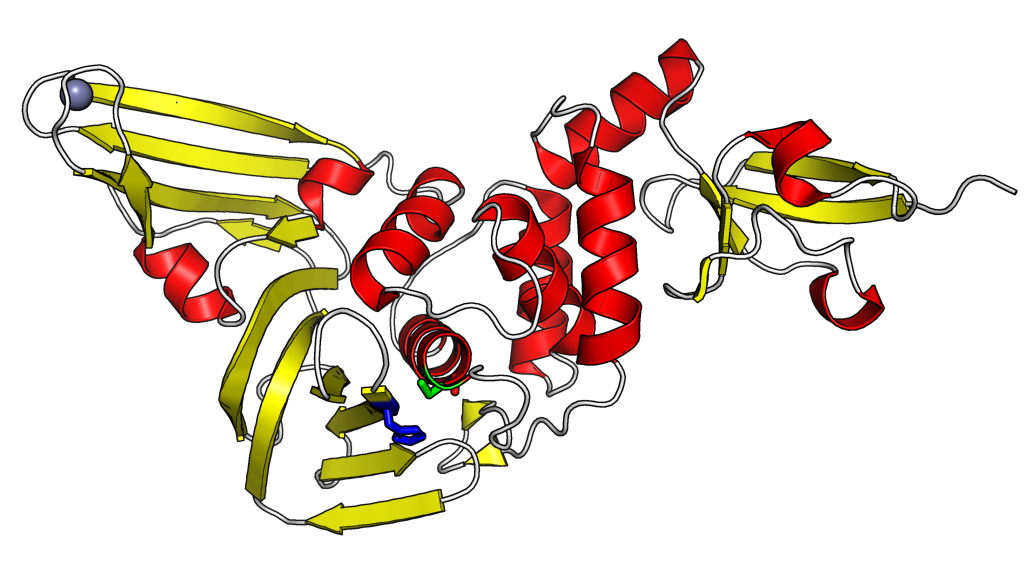
- X-ray crystallography structure of the papain-like protease (PLPro) domain from SARS-CoV-2 non-structural protein 3. The catalytic residues are highlighted with cysteine in green and histidine in blue. The blue sphere is a bound zinc ion. From PDB: 6WZU.

Identifiers
- Symbol: CoV_peptidase
- Pfam: PF08715
- InterPro: IPR013016
Available protein structures:
- PDB: IPR013016 PF08715 (ECOD; PDBsum)
- AlphaFold: IPR013016; PF08715

The nidoviral papain-like protease (PLPro or PLP) is a papain-like protease protein domain encoded in the genomes of nidoviruses. It is expressed as part of a large polyprotein from the ORF1a gene and has cysteine protease enzymatic activity responsible for proteolytic cleavage of some of the N-terminal viral nonstructural proteins within the polyprotein. A second protease also encoded by ORF1a, called the 3C-like protease or main protease, is responsible for the majority of further cleavages. Coronaviruses have one or two papain-like protease domains; in SARS-CoV and SARS-CoV-2, one PLPro domain is located in coronavirus nonstructural protein 3 (nsp3). Arteriviruses have two to three PLP domains. In addition to their protease activity, PLP domains function as deubiquitinating enzymes (DUBs) that can cleave the isopeptide bond found in ubiquitin chains. They are also "deISGylating" enzymes that remove the ubiquitin-like domain interferon-stimulated gene 15 (ISG15) from cellular proteins. These activities are likely responsible for antagonizing the activity of the host innate immune system. Because they are essential for viral replication, papain-like protease domains are considered drug targets for the development of antiviral drugs against human pathogens such as MERS-CoV, SARS-CoV, and SARS-CoV-2.

== Classification and nomenclature ==
According to the MEROPS protease classification system, nidoviral papain-like proteases are members of clan CA, the papain-like proteases, whose structures and catalytic mechanisms are similar to papain. This group contains many viral polyprotein-processing proteases. Proteases in this group are found in all domains of life.

In coronaviruses, single papain-like protease domains are usually known as PLPro, as for example in SARS-CoV and SARS-CoV-2. When two such domains are encoded in the genome, they are known as PLP1 and PLP2 or PLPro1 and PLPro2, where the PLPro of single-domain viruses is more similar to PLP2. In arteriviruses, the three PLP domains are known as PLP1α, PLP1β, and PLP2.

== Function ==
PLPro is a multifunctional enzyme with multiple roles in the viral life cycle, including protease, deubiquitinase, and deISGylating activities. In coronaviruses, it occurs as a protein domain within the large, multi-domain nonstructural protein 3 (nsp3) protein. PLPro activity is essential for viral replication. The evolutionary repurposing of viral proteases for deubiquitination and deISGylation as mechanism for influencing the host innate immune system response is known for a number of viral families.

=== Proteolytic processing ===
Nidoviral PLPro domains are expressed as part of the large polyprotein encoded by the ORF1ab gene. PLPro domains are responsible for proteolytic processing of the polyprotein to generate mature viral nonstructural proteins (nsps), many of which are components of the replicase-transcriptase complex. In coronaviruses, PLPro domains execute the cleavages of the N-terminal nsps1-4, while the 3C-like protease (main protease) cleaves the remaining proteins nsp5-16.

=== Immune modulation ===
==== Deubiquitination ====
A deubiquitinase (DUB) activity was predicted for the SARS-CoV PLPro by structural comparison to ubiquitin-specific protease 18, one of group of cysteine protease DUBs encoded in the human genome. This prediction was later confirmed by in vitro experiments for a number of coronavirus and arterivirus PLP domains, including that of SARS-CoV-2.

==== DeISGylation ====
ISG15 is a small ubiquitin-like protein that can be conjugated to other proteins as a post-translational modification in a manner similar to ubiquitin. In addition to deubiquitinating activity, coronavirus and arterivirus PLP domains have been identified as deISGylase enzymes, capable of removing ISG15 from cellular proteins. In vitro studies of SARS-CoV-2 PLPro suggest a higher affinity for ISG than ubiquitin.
