= Gallinamide A =

Identifiers
| CAS Number | 1208232-55-6 |
| 3D model (JSmol) | Interactive image |
| ChEMBL | ChEMBL541700 |
| ChemSpider | 24614023 |
| PubChem CID | 25209862 |
| CompTox Dashboard (EPA) | DTXSID50153030 |
- InChI: InChI=1S/C15H20ClNO4/c1-14-10(7-8-16)12(19)17-15(14,13(20)21-14)11(18)9-5-3-2-4-6-9/h3,5,9-11,18H,2,4,6-8H2,1H3,(H,17,19)/t9-,10+,11+,14+,15+/m1/s1 Key: NGWSFRIPKNWYAO-SHTIJGAHSA-N; InChI=1/C15H20ClNO4/c1-14-10(7-8-16)12(19)17-15(14,13(20)21-14)11(18)9-5-3-2-4-6-9/h3,5,9-11,18H,2,4,6-8H2,1H3,(H,17,19)/t9-,10+,11+,14+,15+/m1/s1 Key: https://www.ncbi.nlm.nih.gov/pccompound?cmd=search&term=%22ASRBKZHDORPEHO-KYJIWOQOSA-N%22%5BInChIKey%5D
- SMILES: O=C1O[C@@]3(C)[C@H](C(=O)N[C@@]13[C@@H](O)[C@@H]2/C=C\CCC2)CCCl

Properties
| Chemical formula | C_{31}H_{52}N_{4}O_{7} |
| Molar mass | 592.778 g·mol^{−1} |
- Except where otherwise noted, data are given for materials in their standard state (at 25 °C [77 °F], 100 kPa). verify (what is ?) Infobox references

Gallinamide A is potent and selective inhibitor of the human cysteine protease Cathepsin L1 that was first used as a moderate antimalarial agent. Gallinamide A is produced by marine cyanobacteria from Schizothrix species and Symploca sp. which have also shown to have possible anticancer agent, infectious diseases like leishmaniasis, trypanosomiasis and possible uses in Alzheimer's disease, among others.

== History ==
Gallinamide A was first isolated from a Panamanian collection of marine cyanobacteria in 2009 (Schizothrix species) for activity against the malaria causing parasite Plasmodium falciparum. Later, was subsequently and independently isolated by Taori and co-workers from a Floridian Cyanobacteria collection in Key Largo from Symploca sp. and given the name symplostatin 4. Gallinamide A, among other cyanobacteria metabolites such as viridamide A & B, dragonamide E, and almiramide E; are lipodepsipeptides that proved to show anti-infective activities. Gallinamide A was originally isolated with a modest antimalarial activity, which was then proven to be a potent inhibitor of cysteine protease cathepsin L with a IC50 5.0 ug/mL, nonetheless, human cathepsin L is involved in many diseases, gallinamide A was tested in HeLa cervical cancer cells with a IC_{50} 12 mM and in HT-29 colon adenocarcinoma cells with an IC_{50} of mM.

== Mechanism of action ==
Gallinamide A is a potent and selective irreversible inhibitor of human Cathepsin L1, with a high selectivity towards cysteine cathepsin protease family.

== Total synthesis ==
The first stereoselective synthesis was reported by Conroy and co-workers.

== Clinical study ==
Gallinamide A is a potent inhibitor of cathepsin L with an IC_{50} value of 17.6 pM. Also, was tested for its antimalarial activity against the W2 chloroquine-resistant strain of the malaria parasite. This compound showed moderate in vitro activity against Plasmodium falciparum (IC_{50} = 8.4 μM), cytotoxicity to mammalian Vero cells (TC50 = 10.4 μM) and activity against Leishmania donovani of (IC_{50} = 9.3 μM), but was inactive up to the highest tested concentrations against Trypanasoma cruzi (16.9 μM). No in vivo or human testing has been perform since it is only for research development.
