= Abenacianine =

Chemical compound

Clinical data
- Other names: VGT-309

Identifiers
- IUPAC name: 2-[(E)-2-[(3E)-3-[(2E)-2-[5-[bis(3-sulfopropyl)amino]-3,3-dimethyl-1-(3-sulfopropyl)indol-2-ylidene]ethylidene]-2-chlorocyclohexen-1-yl]ethenyl]-3-[6-[2-[[4-[(3S)-7-[6-[2-[(1E,3E,5E,7E)-7-[1,1-dimethyl-3-(4-sulfonatobutyl)benzo[e]indol-2-ylidene]hepta-1,3,5-trienyl]-1,1-dimethylbenzo[e]indol-3-ium-3-yl]hexanoylamino]-2-oxo-3-[[(2S)-3-phenyl-2-(phenylmethoxycarbonylamino)propanoyl]amino]heptoxy]-2,3,5,6-tetrafluorobenzoyl]amino]ethylamino]-6-oxohexyl]-1,1-dimethylbenzo[e]indol-3-ium-7-sulfonate
- CAS Number: 2231255-31-3
- PubChem CID: 171389998
- ChemSpider: 129431710
- UNII: S8N62H5A5W

Chemical and physical data
- Formula: C_{127}H_{145}ClF_{4}N_{10}O_{23}S_{5}
- Molar mass: 2451.35 g·mol^{−1}
- 3D model (JSmol): Interactive image
- SMILES: CC\1(C2=C(C=CC(=C2)N(CCCS(=O)(=O)O)CCCS(=O)(=O)O)N(/C1=C/C=C/3\CCCC(=C3Cl)/C=C/C4=[N+](C5=C(C4(C)C)C6=C(C=C5)C=C(C=C6)S(=O)(=O)[O-])CCCCCC(=O)NCCNC(=O)C7=C(C(=C(C(=C7F)F)OCC(=O)[C@H](CCCCNC(=O)CCCCC[N+]8=C(C(C9=C8C=CC1=CC=CC=C19)(C)C)/C=C/C=C/C=C/C=C/1\C(C2=C(N1CCCCS(=O)(=O)[O-])C=CC1=CC=CC=C12)(C)C)NC(=O)[C@H](CC1=CC=CC=C1)NC(=O)OCC1=CC=CC=C1)F)F)CCCS(=O)(=O)O)C
- InChI: InChI=InChI=1S/C127H145ClF4N10O23S5/c1-124(2)97-82-92(138(70-35-77-167(152,153)154)71-36-78-168(155,156)157)58-64-100(97)139(75-37-79-169(158,159)160)107(124)65-56-89-44-34-45-90(115(89)128)57-66-108-127(7,8)114-96-60-59-93(170(161,162)163)81-91(96)55-63-103(114)142(108)73-31-15-23-52-110(145)134-68-69-135-122(147)111-116(129)118(131)120(119(132)117(111)130)164-84-104(143)98(136-121(146)99(80-85-38-16-12-17-39-85)137-123(148)165-83-86-40-18-13-19-41-86)48-28-29-67-133-109(144)51-22-14-30-72-140-101-61-53-87-42-24-26-46-94(87)112(101)125(3,4)105(140)49-20-10-9-11-21-50-106-126(5,6)113-95-47-27-25-43-88(95)54-62-102(113)141(106)74-32-33-76-166(149,150)151/h9-13,16-21,24-27,38-43,46-47,49-50,53-66,81-82,98-99H,14-15,22-23,28-37,44-45,48,51-52,67-80,83-84H2,1-8H3,(H8-2,133,134,135,136,137,144,145,146,147,148,149,150,151,152,153,154,155,156,157,158,159,160,161,162,163)/t98-,99-/m0/s1; Key:NSTNPRUQYXIYCN-WQLOVQMRSA-N

Abenacianine for injection, also known as VGT-309, is a tumor-targeted fluorescent imaging agent developed by Vergent Bioscience to enhance tumor visualization during cancer surgeries. This compound binds to cathepsins, a family of proteases that are over expressed in various solid tumors, facilitating the detection tumors.
