= Cathepsin zymography =

Cathepsin zymography is a technique for quantifying enzymatic activity of the cathepsin family of cysteine proteases. It is based on SDS-PAGE whereby samples tested for cathepsin activity are loaded into a polyacrylamide gel and then separated by molecular weight. Gelatin is embedded in the gel itself, providing a substrate for the enzymes to hydrolyze.

While the proform of cathepsins are generally stable, once activated, proteases such as cathepsin K are vulnerable to inactivation in neutral pH environments. This loss of activity complicates detection of these enzymes. Zymography, through its high sensitivity and multiplex nature allows for the simultaneous distinction between multiple cathepsins. Very small amounts of enzymatic activity can be elucidated and is capable of resolving a femtomole of cathepsin K activity.

== Zymography protocol ==
Tissue samples are lysed in buffer supplemented with leupeptin to maintain enzymatic activity. The samples are standardized for protein concentration and then loaded into a polyacrylamide gel for SDS-PAGE. After separation of proteins by molecular weight is complete, the gel is incubated in a renaturing buffer to restore enzymatic activity. During loading, a non-reducing buffer was used to preserve protein disulfide bonds. After the renaturing period, the gel is then incubated in assay buffer to allow the now active cathepsins to proteolyze the gelatin impregnated in the gel. This process takes place overnight. The next day, the gel is analyzed for regions of gelatin degradation by coomassie blue staining. Patches of gel that are no longer blue following a destain wash are noted. These bands are then correlated to their respective molecular weights in order to identify which cathepsins were active in the sample.

Cathepsin K detection by zymography

=== Modulating cathepsin selectivity ===
Zymographic techniques for detection of cathepsins K, L, S, and V

== Applications for cathepsin zymography ==
=== Detection of cancer ===
Zymography for detection of cancer with cathepsins as biomarkers

Zymography for cathepsin K.

== See also ==
- Cathepsin
- Zymography
- SDS-PAGE
- Cysteine protease
