= Olgotrelvir =

COVID-19 SARS-CoV-2 3CL-protease-inhibitor antiviral drug

Clinical data
- Trade names: Ovydso
- Other names: STI-1558, HY-156655, CS-0887294
- Routes of administration: By mouth

Identifiers
- IUPAC name: (2S)-1-hydroxy-2-[[(2S)-2-(1H-indole-2-carbonylamino)-4-methylpentanoyl]amino]-3-[(3S)-2-oxopyrrolidin-3-yl]propane-1-sulfonic acid
- CAS Number: 2763596-71-8
- PubChem CID: 166157331
- UNII: ZP3BDH359D
- KEGG: D12777

Chemical and physical data
- Formula: C_{22}H_{30}N_{4}O_{7}S
- Molar mass: 494.56 g·mol^{−1}
- 3D model (JSmol): Interactive image
- SMILES: CC(C)CC(C(=O)NC(CC1CCNC1=O)C(O)S(=O)(=O)O)NC(=O)C2=CC3=CC=CC=C3N2
- InChI: InChI=1S/C22H30N4O7S/c1-12(2)9-16(25-21(29)17-10-13-5-3-4-6-15(13)24-17)20(28)26-18(22(30)34(31,32)33)11-14-7-8-23-19(14)27/h3-6,10,12,14,16,18,22,24,30H,7-9,11H2,1-2H3,(H,23,27)(H,25,29)(H,26,28)(H,31,32,33)/t14-,16-,18-,22?/m0/s1; Key:IICZZAVAIPTWCL-HBIMBUPRSA-N

Olgotrelvir (STI-1558) is an experimental antiviral medication being studied as a potential treatment for COVID-19. It is believed to work by inhibiting the SARS-CoV-2 main protease (M^{pro}), a key enzyme that SARS-CoV-2 needs to replicate, and by blocking viral entry.

China's National Medical Products Administration (NMPA) granted conditional approval for olgotrelvir for the treatment of adult patients with mild-to-moderate COVID-19 in late 2025.

== Mechanism of action ==
Olgotrelvir is a prodrug that first converts to its active form, AC1115. AC1115 is believed to work by inhibiting the SARS-CoV-2 main protease (also known as 3C-like protease). This protein is a crucial enzyme responsible for cleaving viral polyproteins into functional subunits essential for viral replication. By binding to the active site of the protease, the drug prevents this cleavage process, effectively halting viral assembly and impeding the virus's ability to produce future virions.

AC1115 also appears to inhibit cathepsin L (CTSL), a protein implicated in facilitating viral entry of SARS-CoV-2 into the host cell.

== Clinical trials ==
In September 2023, the drug's developer, Sorrento Therapeutics, announced top-line data that olgotrelvir had met its primary endpoints in a phase III clinical trial that enrolled 1,212 patients with mild or moderate COVID-19. The drug appeared to shorten the recovery time of 11 COVID-19 symptoms in olgotrelvir-treated patients by 2.4 days on average compared to patients in the placebo group. The drug was also shown to reduce the viral load at day 4 in treated patients compared to the placebo group. Side effects were mostly mild and infrequent, with the most common being nausea (1.5% vs. 0.2%) and skin rash (3.3% vs. 0.3%), which occurred more often in the olgotrelvir group.
