= Jun12682 =

Antiviral drug

Clinical data
- Other names: HY-157403, CS-0915641, XB5
- Routes of administration: By mouth

Identifiers
- IUPAC name: 5-[2-(dimethylamino)ethoxy]-N-[(1R)-1-[3-(1-ethylpyrazol-3-yl)-5-(1-methylpyrazol-4-yl)phenyl]ethyl]-2-methylbenzamide
- CAS Number: 3055044-56-6
- PubChem CID: 169494310
- ChemSpider: 130043980
- ChEMBL: ChEMBL5594543

Chemical and physical data
- Formula: C_{29}H_{36}N_{6}O_{2}
- Molar mass: 500.647 g·mol^{−1}
- 3D model (JSmol): Interactive image
- SMILES: CCN1C=CC(=N1)C2=CC(=CC(=C2)[C@@H](C)NC(=O)C3=C(C=CC(=C3)OCCN(C)C)C)C4=CN(N=C4)C
- InChI: InChI=1S/C29H36N6O2/c1-7-35-11-10-28(32-35)24-15-22(14-23(16-24)25-18-30-34(6)19-25)21(3)31-29(36)27-17-26(9-8-20(27)2)37-13-12-33(4)5/h8-11,14-19,21H,7,12-13H2,1-6H3,(H,31,36)/t21-/m1/s1; Key:ZOMNORZQANASQP-OAQYLSRUSA-N

Jun12682 is an experimental antiviral medication being studied as a potential treatment for COVID-19. It is believed to work by inhibiting SARS-CoV-2 papain-like protease (PL^{pro}), a crucial enzyme for viral replication.

== Mechanism of action ==
The SARS-CoV-2 virus utilizes several proteases to assist in creating proteins that are essential for viral replication. Among these, the papain-like protease (PL^{pro}) is responsible for cleaving specific sites in the viral polyproteins, facilitating the production of functional viral proteins. By binding to both the BL2 groove and Val70^{Ub} site of PL^{pro} protease, Jun12682 is believed to interfere with the virus's ability to produce new viral proteins, thereby inhibiting the viral replication process. In a study involving mice infected with SARS-CoV-2, mice orally administered Jun12682 experienced reduced viral loads in their lungs, decreased lung lesions, reduced weight loss, and improved survival when compared to those in the control group.

The protease targeted by Jun12682 (PL^{pro}) is distinct from the protease targeted by some other antiviral medications, such as nirmatrelvir/ritonavir, which specifically inhibit the SARS-CoV-2 main protease (M^{pro}). Laboratory studies have indicated that Jun12682 may retain efficacy against certain strains of SARS-CoV-2 that have developed resistance to other antiviral agents, including nirmatrelvir. This characteristic may position Jun12682 as an option in the treatment of COVID-19 in cases where viral resistance to existing therapies is a concern.
