= Cruzipain =

Class of enzymes

Identifiers
- EC no.: 3.4.22.51
- CAS no.: 141588-22-9

Databases
- IntEnz: IntEnz view
- BRENDA: BRENDA entry
- ExPASy: NiceZyme view
- KEGG: KEGG entry
- MetaCyc: metabolic pathway
- PRIAM: profile
- PDB structures: RCSB PDB PDBe PDBsum
Search
- PMC: articles
- PubMed: articles
- NCBI: proteins

Cruzipain is a cysteine protease expressed by Trypanosoma cruzi.

It is classified under EC 3.4.22.51.

Cruzipain is expressed by all strains and developmental forms of Trypanosoma cruzi. It is secreted and can be found in the membrane of the parasite.

The study of Trypanosoma cruzi virulence is difficult due to the complexity of the parasite's biology. Trypanosoma cruzi has two different infective forms which are both biochemically and antigenically distinct. The two forms, MTs and blood trypomastigotes use distinct sets of surface molecules to interact with their respective hosts. Trypanosoma cruzi also uses unique processes for gene expression, such as RNA editing, trans-splicing, and constitutive polycistronic transcription of protein-coding genes. In the absence of mechanisms controlling initiation of transcription, extracellular signals will trigger subsets of Trypanosoma cruzi genes to be post-transcriptionally co-regulated.

Cruzipain is part of clan CA, a group of papain-like protease enzymes. Clan CA is the most studied class of cysteine proteinases in parasitic protozoa. The localization of cruzipain within the cell differs based on which stage of the biological cycle the parasite is in. Cruzipain is involved in aiding the parasite in penetrating and evading the immune response of the host. The cysteine peptidases within parasitic protozoa are pivotal for several biological processes. Metamorphosis, immune evasion, and adaptation to certain hosts are some of the processes that cruzipain can exert influence over.

Cruzipain is a sulfated glycoprotein which plays a role in the parasitic disease known as Chagas disease. It is found to aid the parasite in entering the host cell and in evading an immune response.

Cruzipain can help parasites escape the response from the adaptive immune system by interfering with the functions of immunoglobulins from the immunoglobin G subclasses. These immunoglobulins are bound to receptors and cruzipain interacts with these immunoglobulins by cleaving their hinges.

During smooth muscle cell invasion, cruzipain may mobilize vasoconstricting endothelin receptors, which may interfere with the vasoconstrictor's ability to cause the blood vessels to become narrower.

Cruzipain aids in the process of breaking down host tissue and is prepared to signal the escape mechanism if it detects any response from the host's immune system.

== Cruzipain as a DNA-based therapeutic vaccine ==
It has been reported that cruzipain is an efficient prophylactic vaccine, combined with several adjuvants, and administered through different routes. Results have been found using a cruzipain DNA-based vaccine that has demonstrated a decrease in parasitemia, inflammatory cell infiltrate, and tissue damage in models of infection caused by Trypanosoma cruzi. In the experiment, chagasin, a natural protein of Trypanosoma cruzi, and a tight binding inhibitor of papain-like cysteine proteases is used. Chagasin regulates the activity of cruzipain by controlling the functions that are necessary for parasitic invasion into mammalian cells. By combining the DNA of cruzipain and chagasin to synthesize a vaccine, a balanced immune response that decreases blood and tissue parasites, as well as the tissue damage caused by Trypanosoma cruzi infection can be induced.

== Chemotherapy of chronic Chagas disease ==
There are currently only two drugs in use for the treatment of Chagas disease, specifically nifurtimox and benznidazole. Both of these drugs require long use, cause adverse side effects, and have controversial efficacy in adults infected with Trypanosoma cruzi. Recently, through drug repurposing, a strategy which utilizes existing drugs for new therapeutic purposes, the trypanocidal effects of benidipine and clofazimine have been discovered. These drugs showed the ability to inhibit cruzipain, by diminishing the burden of the parasite in skeletal and cardiac muscles, as well as by reducing the inflammatory response in the tissues of Trypanosoma cruzi infected mice.
