= Ectodomain =

Protein domain

An ectodomain is the domain of a membrane protein that extends into the extracellular space (the space outside a cell). Ectodomains are usually the parts of proteins that initiate contact with surfaces, which leads to signal transduction. A notable example of an ectodomain is the S protein, commonly known as the spike protein, of the viral particle responsible for the COVID-19 pandemic. The ectodomain region of the spike protein (S) is essential for attachment and eventual entry of the viral protein into the host cell.

Ectodomains play a crucial part in the signaling pathways of viruses. Recent findings have indicated that certain antibodies including the anti-receptor binding domain (anti-RBD) or anti-spike ectodomain (anti-ECD) IgG titers can act as virus neutralization titers (VN titers) which can be identified in individuals with diseases, dyspnea and hospitalizations. In perspective of severe acute respiratory syndrome corona virus 2 (SARS-Cov-2) these specific ectodomains may detect antibody efficacy against SARS-Cov-2, in which VN titers can classify eligible plasma donors. Protective measures against diseases and respiratory conditions can further be advanced through ongoing research on ectodomains. Ectodomain's play a crucial part in the signaling pathways of viruses.

Ectodomains also interact with membrane systems inducing vesicle aggregation, lipid mixing and liposome leakage which provides information as to how certain viruses spread infection throughout the cellular domain. Specifically, the hepatitis C virus (HCV) utilize a fusion process in which the ectodomain of HCV E2 envelope protein confers fusogenic properties to membrane systems implying HCV infection proceeds throughout the cell through receptor mediated endocytosis. These findings in the role of the ectodomains interacting with target membranes give insight into virus destabilization and mechanism of the fusion of viral and cellular membrane which is yet to be further characterized.

== See also ==
- Ectodomain shedding
