= Preproenzyme =

A preproenzyme is an enzyme with two additional characteristics: "pre" refers to a signal sequence (signal peptide) which directs the enzyme to a specific organelle or subcellular localization; "pro" indicates that the enzyme is present in an inactive form and requires modification (e.g. cleavage) for activation.

== See also ==
- Protein precursor
- Zymogen
