= FBXO6 =

Protein-coding gene in humans

Identifiers
- Aliases: FBXO6, FBG2, FBS2, FBX6, Fbx6b, F-box protein 6
- External IDs: OMIM: 605647; MGI: 1354743; GeneCards: FBXO6

Gene location (Human)
| Chr. | Chromosome 1 (human) |
| Band | 1p36.22 | Start | 11,664,200 bp |
| Band | 1p36.22 | End | 11,674,354 bp |

Gene location (Mouse)
| Chr. | Chromosome 4 (mouse) |
| Band | 4 E2|4 78.67 cM | Start | 148,230,173 bp |
| Band | 4 E2|4 78.67 cM | End | 148,236,597 bp |
RNA expression pattern
| Bgee | Human / Mouse (ortholog); Top expressed in: granulocyte; monocyte; muscle of thigh; gastrocnemius muscle; bronchial epithelial cell; blood; right lobe of liver; olfactory zone of nasal mucosa; mucosa of ileum; right adrenal gland / Top expressed in: urinary bladder; muscle of thigh; adrenal gland; muscle tissue; skeletal muscle tissue; quadriceps femoris muscle; placenta; white adipose tissue; lip; right kidney; More reference expression data |
| BioGPS | n/a |
Gene ontology
| Molecular function | ubiquitin protein ligase activity; carbohydrate binding; ubiquitin-protein transferase activity; protein binding |
| Cellular component | cytoplasm; SCF ubiquitin ligase complex; endoplasmic reticulum quality control compartment; cytosol |
| Biological process | cellular response to DNA damage stimulus; DNA damage checkpoint signaling; SCF-dependent proteasomal ubiquitin-dependent protein catabolic process; response to unfolded protein; DNA repair; protein ubiquitination; proteolysis; ubiquitin-dependent ERAD pathway; glycoprotein catabolic process; protein polyubiquitination; post-translational protein modification |
Sources:Amigo / QuickGO
Orthologs
| Databases | NCBI: entry; OMA: entry |
| Species | Human | Mouse |
| Entrez | 26270 | 50762 |
| Ensembl | ENSG00000116663 | ENSMUSG00000055401 |
| UniProt | Q9NRD1 | Q9QZN4 |
| RefSeq (mRNA) | NM_018438 | NM_001163704; NM_001163705; NM_001163706; NM_001163707; NM_015797 |
| RefSeq (protein) | NP_060908 | NP_001157176; NP_001157177; NP_001157178; NP_001157179; NP_056612 |
| Location (UCSC) | Chr 1: 11.66 – 11.67 Mb | Chr 4: 148.23 – 148.24 Mb |
| PubMed search |
- Wikidata
| View/Edit Human | View/Edit Mouse |

F-box only protein 6 is a protein that in humans is encoded by the FBXO6 gene.

This gene encodes a member of the F-box protein family which is characterized by an approximately 40 amino acid motif, the F-box. The F-box proteins constitute one of the four subunits of the ubiquitin protein ligase complex called SCFs (SKP1-cullin-F-box), which function in phosphorylation-dependent ubiquitination. The F-box proteins are divided into 3 classes: Fbws containing WD-40 domains, Fbls containing leucine-rich repeats, and Fbxs containing either different protein-protein interaction modules or no recognizable motifs. The protein encoded by this gene belongs to the Fbxs class, and its C-terminal region is highly similar to that of rat NFB42 (neural F Box 42 kDa) which may be involved in the control of the cell cycle.
