= Cathepsin F =

Protein-coding gene in the species Homo sapiens (Humans)

CTSF
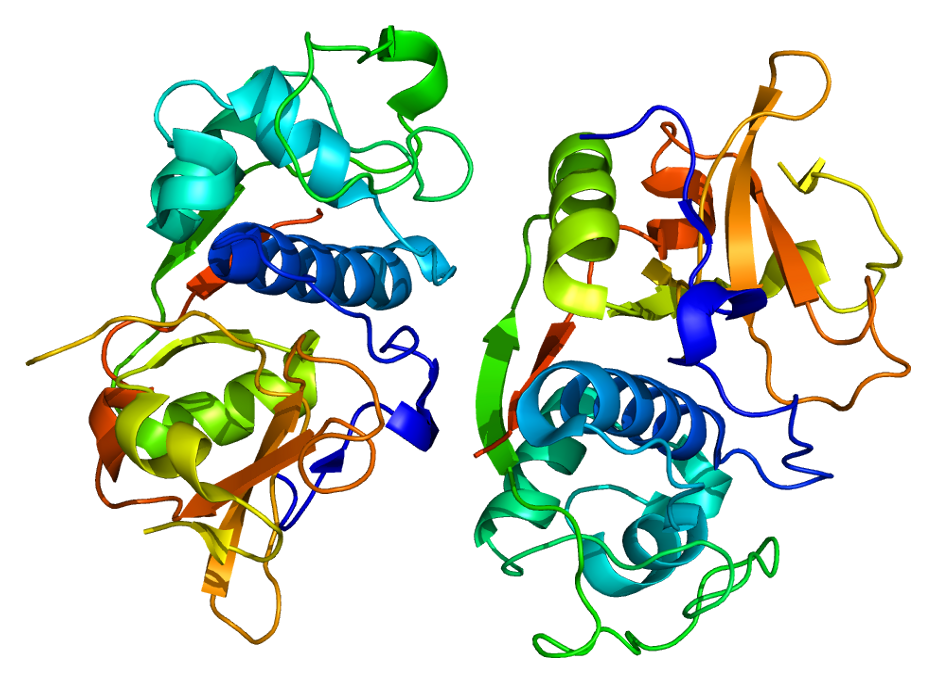

Identifiers
- Aliases: CTSF, CATSF, CLN13, cathepsin F
- External IDs: OMIM: 603539; MGI: 1861434; GeneCards: CTSF
Available structures
PDB	Ortholog search: PDBe RCSB
PDB	List of PDB id codes 1M6D
Enzyme activity
EC #	BRENDA	ExPASy	KEGG	MetaCyc
3.4.22.41	↗	↗	↗	↗

Gene location (Human)
Chr.	Chromosome 11 (human)
Band	11q13.2	Start	66,563,464 bp
Band	11q13.2	End	66,568,879 bp

Gene location (Mouse)
Chr.	Chromosome 19 (mouse)
Band	19|19 A	Start	4,905,158 bp
Band	19|19 A	End	4,910,946 bp
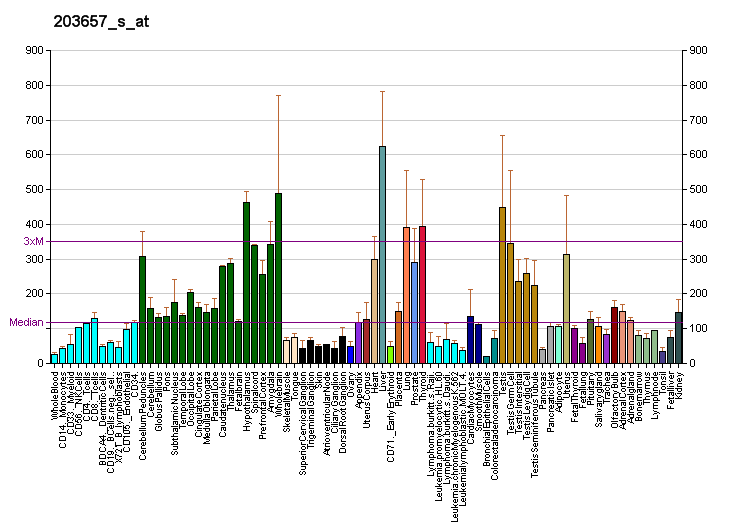
RNA expression pattern
Bgee	Human / Mouse (ortholog); Top expressed in: right hemisphere of cerebellum; left testis; right testis; right coronary artery; left ovary; right frontal lobe; right ovary; tibial nerve; gastric mucosa; ascending aorta / Top expressed in: neural layer of retina; adrenal gland; right kidney; choroid plexus of fourth ventricle; lip; cerebellar cortex; primary visual cortex; epithelium of lens; superior frontal gyrus; dentate gyrus of hippocampal formation granule cell; More reference expression data
BioGPS	More reference expression data
Gene ontology
Molecular function	peptidase activity; cysteine-type peptidase activity; hydrolase activity; cysteine-type endopeptidase activity
Cellular component	extracellular vesicle; lysosome; lysosomal lumen; extracellular exosome; extracellular space; collagen-containing extracellular matrix
Biological process	proteolysis involved in cellular protein catabolic process; antigen processing and presentation of exogenous peptide antigen via MHC class II; proteolysis
Sources:Amigo / QuickGO
Orthologs
Databases	NCBI: entry; OMA: entry
Species	Human	Mouse
Entrez	8722	56464
Ensembl	ENSG00000174080	ENSMUSG00000083282
UniProt	Q9UBX1	Q9R013
RefSeq (mRNA)	NM_003793	NM_019861
RefSeq (protein)	NP_003784	NP_063914
Location (UCSC)	Chr 11: 66.56 – 66.57 Mb	Chr 19: 4.91 – 4.91 Mb
PubMed search
- Wikidata
View/Edit Human	View/Edit Mouse

Cathepsin F is a protein that in humans is encoded by the CTSF gene.

Cysteine cathepsins are a family of cysteine proteases that represent a major component of the lysosomal proteolytic system. In general, cathepsins contain a signal peptide, followed by a propeptide and then a catalytically active mature region. The very long (251-amino acid residues) proregion of the cathepsin F precursor contains a C-terminal domain similar to the pro-segment of Cathepsin L-like enzymes, a 50-residue flexible linker peptide, and an N-terminal domain predicted to adopt a cystatin-like fold. The cathepsin F proregion is unique within the papain family cysteine proteases in that it contains this additional N-terminal segment predicted to share structural similarities with cysteine protease inhibitors of the cystatin superfamily. This cystatin-like domain contains some of the elements known to be important for inhibitory activity. CTSF encodes a predicted protein of 484 amino acids that contains a 19-residue signal peptide. Cathepsin F contains five potential N-glycosylation sites, and it may be targeted to the endosomal/lysosomal compartment via the mannose 6-phosphate receptor pathway. The cathepsin F gene is ubiquitously expressed, and it maps to chromosome 11q13, close to the gene encoding cathepsin W.

== In non-human species ==
=== Immunodiagnosis of Opisthorchis viverrini ===
Opisthorchis viverrini, a parasite, is typically detected by stool examination, specifically by counting eggs. However, this non-invasive, "gold standard" method can be unreliable in light infection and labor-intensive. An ELISA assay that detects the presence of the parasite's cathepsin F protein may be used as an alternative way to test for the parasite's presence.

=== Discovery in Yesso scallop (Mizuhopecten yessoensis) ===
The Yesso scallop (Mizuhopecten yessoensis), was found in 2018 to express Cathepsin F in response to bacterial infection. The Yesso scallop has been suffering from high mortality due to bacterial diseases. Understanding the workings of its innate immune system, in various embryonic developmental stages, may help the associated aquaculture industry.
