= Cathepsin S =

Protein found in humans

CTSS
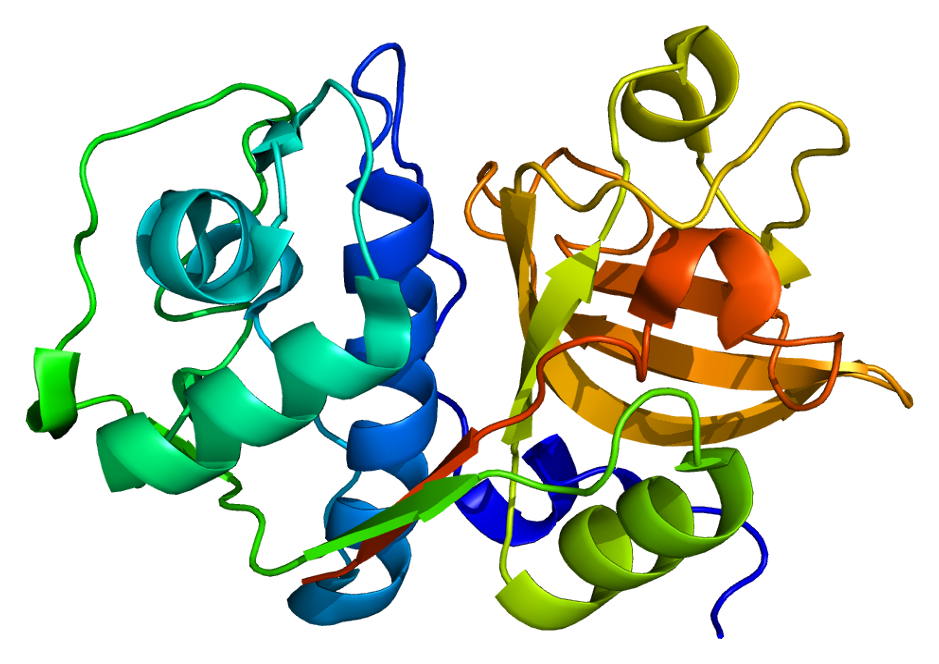

Identifiers
- Aliases: CTSS, cathepsin S
- External IDs: OMIM: 116845; MGI: 107341; GeneCards: CTSS
Available structures
| PDB | Ortholog search: PDBe RCSB |
| PDB | List of PDB id codes 1GLO, 1MS6, 1NPZ, 1NQC, 2C0Y, 2F1G, 2FQ9, 2FRA, 2FRQ, 2FT2, 2FUD, 2FYE, 2G6D, 2G7Y, 2H7J, 2HH5, 2HHN, 2HXZ, 2OP3, 2R9M, 2R9N, 2R9O, 3IEJ, 3KWN, 3MPE, 3MPF, 3N3G, 3N4C, 3OVX, 4P6E, 4P6G |
Enzyme activity
| EC # | BRENDA | ExPASy | KEGG | MetaCyc |
|---|---|---|---|---|
| 3.4.22.27 | ↗ | ↗ | ↗ | ↗ |

Gene location (Human)
| Chr. | Chromosome 1 (human) |
| Band | 1q21.3 | Start | 150,730,079 bp |
| Band | 1q21.3 | End | 150,765,957 bp |

Gene location (Mouse)
| Chr. | Chromosome 3 (mouse) |
| Band | 3 F2.1|3 40.74 cM | Start | 95,434,097 bp |
| Band | 3 F2.1|3 40.74 cM | End | 95,463,714 bp |
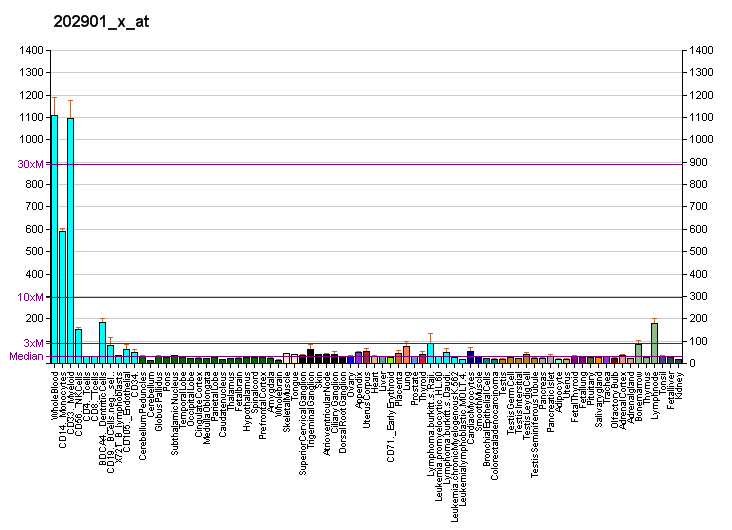

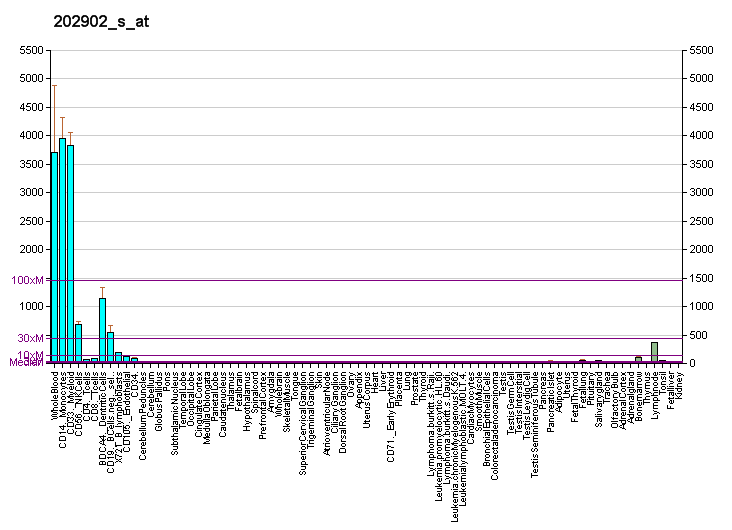
RNA expression pattern
| Bgee | Human / Mouse (ortholog); Top expressed in: monocyte; granulocyte; blood; rectum; bone marrow cell; gallbladder; mucosa of sigmoid colon; appendix; epithelium of colon; trabecular bone / Top expressed in: stroma of bone marrow; mesenteric lymph nodes; calvaria; left colon; spleen; right lung lobe; ileum; globus pallidus; submandibular gland; median eminence; More reference expression data |
| BioGPS | More reference expression data |
Gene ontology
| Molecular function | fibronectin binding; cysteine-type peptidase activity; collagen binding; peptidase activity; cysteine-type endopeptidase activity; laminin binding; hydrolase activity; proteoglycan binding; serine-type endopeptidase activity |
| Cellular component | intracellular membrane-bounded organelle; extracellular region; endolysosome lumen; lysosomal lumen; lysosome; extracellular space; tertiary granule lumen; ficolin-1-rich granule lumen; collagen-containing extracellular matrix; late endosome |
| Biological process | positive regulation of cation channel activity; antigen processing and presentation; adaptive immune response; antigen processing and presentation of exogenous peptide antigen via MHC class II; protein processing; extracellular matrix disassembly; proteolysis; toll-like receptor signaling pathway; antigen processing and presentation of peptide antigen; immune response; cellular response to thyroid hormone stimulus; collagen catabolic process; proteolysis involved in cellular protein catabolic process; basement membrane disassembly; response to acidic pH; neutrophil degranulation |
Sources:Amigo / QuickGO
Orthologs
| Databases | NCBI: entry; OMA: entry |
| Species | Human | Mouse |
| Entrez | 1520 | 13040 |
| Ensembl | ENSG00000163131 | ENSMUSG00000038642 |
| UniProt | P25774 | O70370 |
| RefSeq (mRNA) | NM_004079; NM_001199739 | NM_001267695; NM_021281 |
| RefSeq (protein) | NP_001186668; NP_004070 | NP_001254624; NP_067256 |
| Location (UCSC) | Chr 1: 150.73 – 150.77 Mb | Chr 3: 95.43 – 95.46 Mb |
| PubMed search |
- Wikidata
| View/Edit Human | View/Edit Mouse |

Cathepsin S is a protein that in humans is encoded by the CTSS gene. Transcript variants utilizing alternative polyadenylation signals exist for this gene.

Cathepsin S is a member of the peptidase C1 family of cysteine cathepsins, a lysosomal cysteine protease that may participate in the degradation of antigenic proteins to peptides for presentation to the MHC class II. Cathepsin S can function as an elastase over a broad pH range in alveolar macrophages.

== Function ==
Cathepsin S is a lysosomal enzyme that belongs to the papain-like protease family of cysteine proteases. While its role in antigen presentation has long been recognized, recent research has highlighted its involvement in itch and pain, or nociception. The nociceptive activity of cathepsin S results from its role as a signaling molecule through the activation of protease-activated receptors 2 and 4, which are members of the G-protein-coupled receptor family.

=== Extracellular matrix degradation ===
Secreted cathepsin S cleaves several extracellular matrix (ECM) proteins. It is considered one of the most potent elastases known. Its substrates include laminin, fibronectin, elastin, osteocalcin, and various collagens. It also degrades chondroitin sulfate, heparan sulfate, and proteoglycans of the basement membrane.

Cathepsin S influences blood vessel permeability and angiogenesis due to its elastolytic and collagenolytic activities. For example, cleavage of laminin-5 by cathepsin S generates proangiogenic peptides.

=== Antigen presentation ===
Cathepsin S has a crucial role in antigen presentation. Major histocompatibility complex (MHC) class II molecules interact with peptide fragments for presentation on antigen-presenting cells. Cathepsin S degrades the invariant chain (Ii), which prevents antigen loading into the MHC complex. This degradation occurs in lysosomes after two initial cleavages by aspartyl proteases. Cathepsin S cleaves the remaining Ii fragment (IiP1), leaving a small portion (CLIP) directly associated with MHC II.

Proper degradation of Ii facilitates CLIP dissociation and antigen loading. Overexpression of cathepsin S may lead to premature Ii degradation, occasional antigen loading, and potential autoimmune responses. Conversely, inhibition of cathepsin S delays antigen loading, weakens immune responses, and results in uncleaved Ii fragments remaining on the MHC II surface, impairing T-cell proliferation. In macrophages, cathepsin S can be replaced by cathepsin F.

== Expression and stability ==
Cathepsin S is expressed by antigen-presenting cells such as macrophages, B-lymphocytes, dendritic cells, and microglia. It is also produced by some epithelial cells, and its expression significantly increases in human keratinocytes upon stimulation with interferon-gamma. In psoriatic keratinocytes, its expression is elevated due to proinflammatory factors. However, cortical thymic epithelial cells do not express cathepsin S.

Unlike many members of the cysteine cathepsin family, cathepsin S remains stable at neutral or slightly alkaline pH.

== Secretion and regulation ==
Unlike many lysosomal proteases that are confined within lysosomes due to stability issues, cathepsin S remains stable outside the lysosome, allowing it to function in extracellular processes. Immune cells, including macrophages and microglia, secrete cathepsin S in response to inflammatory mediators such as lipopolysaccharides, proinflammatory cytokines, and neutrophils. Cathepsin S is produced as a zymogen and activated through proteolytic processing. It retains some enzymatic activity even in the presence of 3M urea.

The activity of cathepsin S is tightly regulated by its endogenous inhibitor, cystatin C, which also plays a role in antigen presentation. Cystatin A and B have lower inhibitory activity compared to cystatin C.

== Clinical significance ==
Cathepsin S has been shown to be a significant prognostic factor for patients with type IV astrocytomas (glioblastoma multiforme), and its inhibition has shown to increase survival time. This is because the cysteine enzyme can no longer act together with other proteases to break up the brain extracellular matrix.

Several studies have suggested cathepsin S is a biomarker for atherosclerosis and type 2 diabetes.

=== Nociception ===
Cathepsin S has a role in nociception, including itch and gastrointestinal pain. The mechanism by which cathepsin S leads to itch and pain is consistent with the capacity of this cysteine protease to activate protease-activated receptors 2 and 4.

=== Role in tumorigenesis ===
In tumorigenesis, cathepsin S promotes tumor growth. Its expression can be triggered by proinflammatory factors secreted by tumor cells, contributing to cancer progression.

=== Cytokine regulation ===
Cathepsin S expression and activity are upregulated in the skin of psoriasis patients. Although its definitive role in psoriasis pathology is not yet clear, cathepsin S has been shown to cleave and activate the psoriasis-associated proinflammatory cytokine IL-36γ.

=== Inhibitors ===
Synthetic inhibitors of cathepsin S participated in numerous preclinical studies for the immune disorders including rheumatoid arthritis. Currently, at least one of them participates in a clinical trial for psoriasis. LHVS (morpholinurea-leucine-homophenylalanine-vinylsulfone-phenyl) is the most extensively studied synthetic inhibitor of cathepsin S. IC50 of LHVS is about 5 nM. Inhibition of cathepsin S by LHVS has shown to be neuroprotective after traumatic brain injury. The list of commercial inhibitors also includes paecilopeptin (acetyl-Leu-Val-CHO) and some others.

== See also ==
- Cathepsin
