= Cathepsin O =

Protein-coding gene in the species Homo sapiens

CTSO

Identifiers
- Aliases: CTSO, CTSO1, cathepsin O
- External IDs: OMIM: 600550; MGI: 2139628; GeneCards: CTSO
Available structures
PDB	Ortholog search: PDBe RCSB
PDB	List of PDB id codes 1ATK, 1AU0, 1AU2, 1AU3, 1AU4, 1AYU, 1AYV, 1AYW, 1BGO, 1BY8, 1MEM, 1NL6, 1NLJ, 1Q6K, 1SNK, 1TU6, 1U9V, 1U9W, 1U9X, 1VSN, 1YK7, 1YK8, 1YT7, 2ATO, 2AUX, 2AUZ, 2BDL, 2R6N, 3C9E, 3H7D, 3KW9, 3KWB, 3KWZ, 3KX1, 3O0U, 3O1G, 3OVZ, 4DMX, 4DMY, 7PCK, 4LEG, 4N79, 4N8W
Enzyme activity
EC #	BRENDA	ExPASy	KEGG	MetaCyc
3.4.22.42	↗	↗	↗	↗

Gene location (Human)
Chr.	Chromosome 4 (human)
Band	4q32.1	Start	155,921,580 bp
Band	4q32.1	End	155,953,912 bp

Gene location (Mouse)
Chr.	Chromosome 3 (mouse)
Band	3|3 E3	Start	81,839,908 bp
Band	3|3 E3	End	81,864,032 bp
RNA expression pattern
Bgee	Human / Mouse (ortholog); Top expressed in: Achilles tendon; gallbladder; endometrium; right coronary artery; smooth muscle tissue; placenta; gastric mucosa; liver; duodenum; monocyte / Top expressed in: gastrula; mesenteric lymph nodes; otolith organ; utricle; median eminence; carotid body; Epithelium of choroid plexus; left lobe of liver; decidua; white adipose tissue; More reference expression data
BioGPS	n/a
Gene ontology
Molecular function	peptidase activity; cysteine-type endopeptidase activity; cysteine-type peptidase activity; hydrolase activity
Cellular component	lysosome; extracellular space
Biological process	proteolysis involved in cellular protein catabolic process; proteolysis
Sources:Amigo / QuickGO
Orthologs
Databases	NCBI: entry; OMA: entry
Species	Human	Mouse
Entrez	1519	229445
Ensembl	ENSG00000256043	ENSMUSG00000028015
UniProt	P43234	Q8BM88
RefSeq (mRNA)	NM_001334	NM_177662
RefSeq (protein)	NP_001325	NP_808330
Location (UCSC)	Chr 4: 155.92 – 155.95 Mb	Chr 3: 81.84 – 81.86 Mb
PubMed search
- Wikidata
View/Edit Human	View/Edit Mouse

Cathepsin O is an enzyme encoded by the CTSO gene in humans.

== Function ==
Cathepsin O is a cysteine cathepsin, a cysteine protease and a member of the cathepsin family. This proteolytic enzyme is involved in cellular protein degradation and turnover. The recombinant form of this enzyme was shown to degrade synthetic peptides typically used as substrates for cysteine proteinases, and its proteolytic activity was abolished by an inhibitor of cysteine proteinase.
