= Cathepsin H =

Protein-coding gene in the species Homo sapiens

CTSH
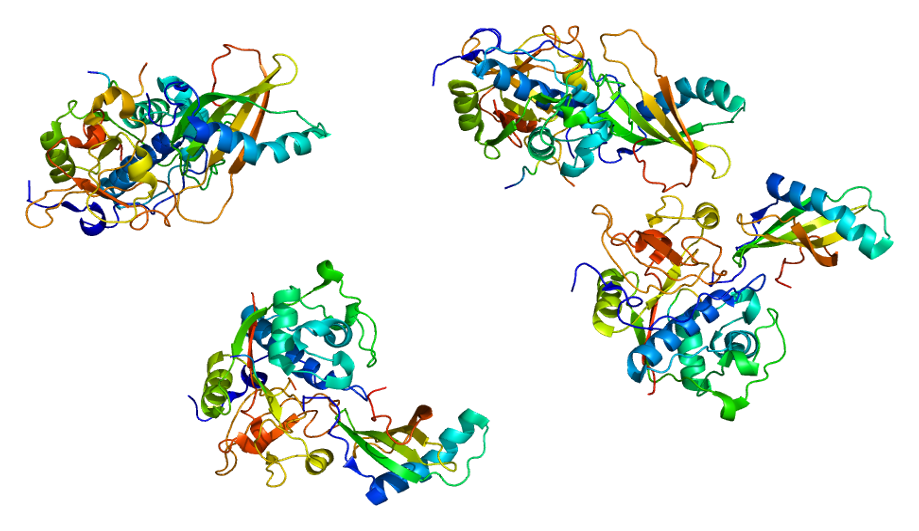

Identifiers
- Aliases: CTSH, ACC-4, ACC-5, CPSB, minichain, ACC4, ACC5, cathepsin H
- External IDs: OMIM: 116820; MGI: 107285; GeneCards: CTSH
Available structures
PDB	Ortholog search: PDBe RCSB
PDB	List of PDB id codes 1BZN
Enzyme activity
EC #	BRENDA	ExPASy	KEGG	MetaCyc
3.4.22.16	↗	↗	↗	↗

Gene location (Human)
Chr.	Chromosome 15 (human)
Band	15q25.1	Start	78,921,058 bp
Band	15q25.1	End	78,949,574 bp

Gene location (Mouse)
Chr.	Chromosome 9 (mouse)
Band	9 E3.1|9 47.4 cM	Start	89,936,205 bp
Band	9 E3.1|9 47.4 cM	End	89,958,142 bp
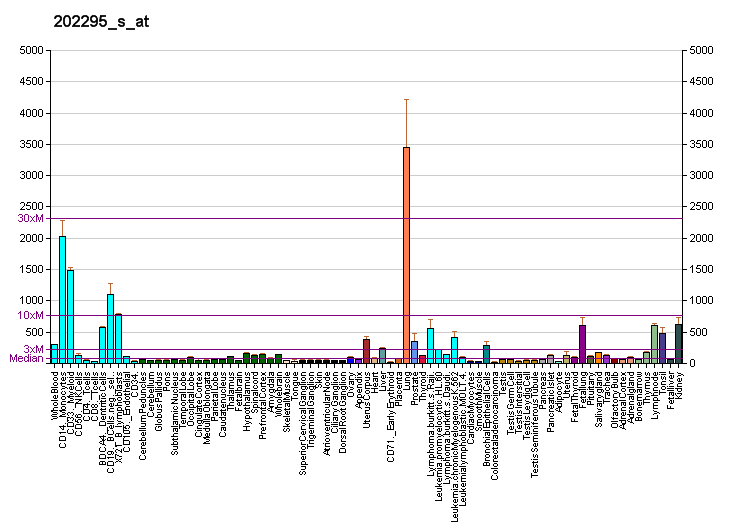
RNA expression pattern
Bgee	Human / Mouse (ortholog); Top expressed in: optic nerve; kidney tubule; lower lobe of lung; bronchial epithelial cell; visceral pleura; renal medulla; monocyte; lymph node; upper lobe of lung; human kidney / Top expressed in: left lung lobe; right lung lobe; yolk sac; parotid gland; right kidney; mesenteric lymph nodes; proximal tubule; granulocyte; cervix; left lobe of liver; More reference expression data
BioGPS	More reference expression data
Gene ontology
Molecular function	peptidase activator activity involved in apoptotic process; cysteine-type peptidase activity; HLA-A specific activating MHC class I receptor activity; endopeptidase activity; protein binding; cysteine-type endopeptidase activator activity involved in apoptotic process; cysteine-type endopeptidase activity; aminopeptidase activity; serine-type endopeptidase activity; hydrolase activity; thyroid hormone binding; peptidase activity
Cellular component	cytosol; alveolar lamellar body; lysosome; extracellular exosome; multivesicular body lumen; extracellular region; extracellular space; secretory granule lumen; intracellular membrane-bounded organelle; tertiary granule lumen; ficolin-1-rich granule lumen; cytoplasmic ribonucleoprotein granule; collagen-containing extracellular matrix
Biological process	surfactant homeostasis; antigen processing and presentation; adaptive immune response; bradykinin catabolic process; response to retinoic acid; membrane protein proteolysis; positive regulation of cell migration; ERK1 and ERK2 cascade; zymogen activation; neuropeptide catabolic process; positive regulation of epithelial cell migration; positive regulation of apoptotic signaling pathway; negative regulation of apoptotic process; proteolysis; positive regulation of angiogenesis; positive regulation of peptidase activity; positive regulation of gene expression; protein destabilization; cellular response to thyroid hormone stimulus; positive regulation of cell population proliferation; immune response-regulating signaling pathway; proteolysis involved in cellular protein catabolic process; metanephros development; dichotomous subdivision of terminal units involved in lung branching; T cell mediated cytotoxicity; apoptotic process; activation of cysteine-type endopeptidase activity involved in apoptotic process; neutrophil degranulation
Sources:Amigo / QuickGO
Orthologs
Databases	NCBI: entry; OMA: entry
Species	Human	Mouse
Entrez	1512	13036
Ensembl	ENSG00000103811	ENSMUSG00000032359
UniProt	P09668	P49935
RefSeq (mRNA)	NM_004390; NM_148979; NM_001319137	NM_007801; NM_001312649
RefSeq (protein)	NP_001306066; NP_004381	NP_001299578; NP_031827
Location (UCSC)	Chr 15: 78.92 – 78.95 Mb	Chr 9: 89.94 – 89.96 Mb
PubMed search
- Wikidata
View/Edit Human	View/Edit Mouse

Cathepsin H is a protein that in humans is encoded by the CTSH gene.

The protein encoded by this gene is a cysteine cathepsin, a lysosomal cysteine protease important in the overall degradation of lysosomal proteins. It is composed of a dimer of disulfide-linked heavy and light chains, both produced from a single protein precursor. The encoded protein, which belongs to the peptidase C1 protein family, can act both as an aminopeptidase and as an endopeptidase. Increased expression of this gene has been correlated with malignant progression of prostate tumors. Two transcript variants encoding different isoforms have been found for this gene.
