= Cathepsin W =

Protein-coding gene in the species Homo sapiens

CTSW

Identifiers
- Aliases: CTSW, LYPN, cathepsin W
- External IDs: OMIM: 602364; MGI: 1338045; GeneCards: CTSW

Gene location (Human)
Chr.	Chromosome 11 (human)
Band	11q13.1	Start	65,879,809 bp
Band	11q13.1	End	65,883,741 bp

Gene location (Mouse)
Chr.	Chromosome 19 (mouse)
Band	19|19 A	Start	5,515,071 bp
Band	19|19 A	End	5,518,535 bp
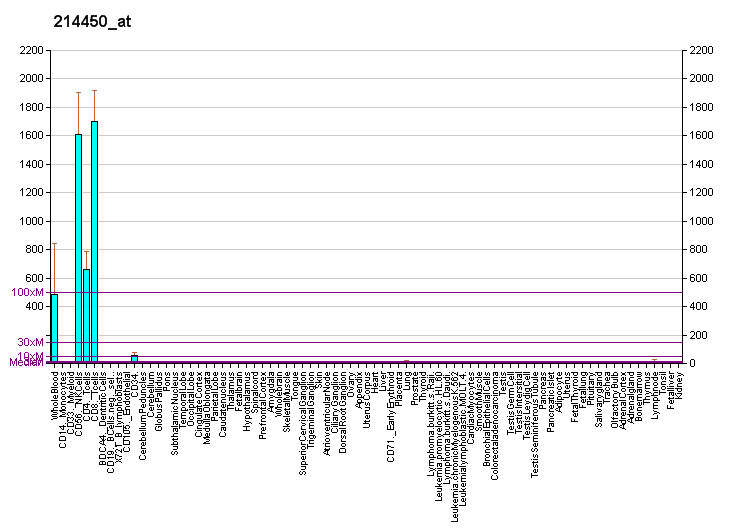
RNA expression pattern
Bgee	Human / Mouse (ortholog); Top expressed in: granulocyte; blood; bone marrow cell; spleen; decidua; mononuclear cell; monocyte; lymph node; upper lobe of left lung; right lung / Top expressed in: mesenteric lymph nodes; blood; thymus; spleen; embryo; subcutaneous adipose tissue; pharynx; duodenum; embryo; granulocyte; More reference expression data
BioGPS	More reference expression data
Gene ontology
Molecular function	peptidase activity; cysteine-type endopeptidase activity; cysteine-type peptidase activity; hydrolase activity
Cellular component	lysosome; membrane; platelet dense granule lumen; extracellular region; extracellular space; endoplasmic reticulum
Biological process	proteolysis involved in cellular protein catabolic process; immune response; proteolysis; platelet degranulation
Sources:Amigo / QuickGO
Orthologs
Databases	NCBI: entry; OMA: entry
Species	Human	Mouse
Entrez	1521	13041
Ensembl	ENSG00000172543	ENSMUSG00000024910
UniProt	P56202	P56203
RefSeq (mRNA)	NM_001335	NM_009985
RefSeq (protein)	NP_001326	NP_034115
Location (UCSC)	Chr 11: 65.88 – 65.88 Mb	Chr 19: 5.52 – 5.52 Mb
PubMed search
- Wikidata
View/Edit Human	View/Edit Mouse

Cathepsin W is a protein that in humans is encoded by the CTSW gene.

The protein encoded by this gene, a member of the peptidase C1 family of cysteine cathepsins, is a cysteine protease cathepsin that may have a specific function in the mechanism or regulation of T-cell cytolytic activity. The encoded protein is found associated with the cell membrane inside the endoplasmic reticulum of natural killer and cytotoxic T-cells. Expression of this gene is up-regulated by interleukin-2.
