= Cathepsin L1 =

Protein-coding gene in humans

CTSL
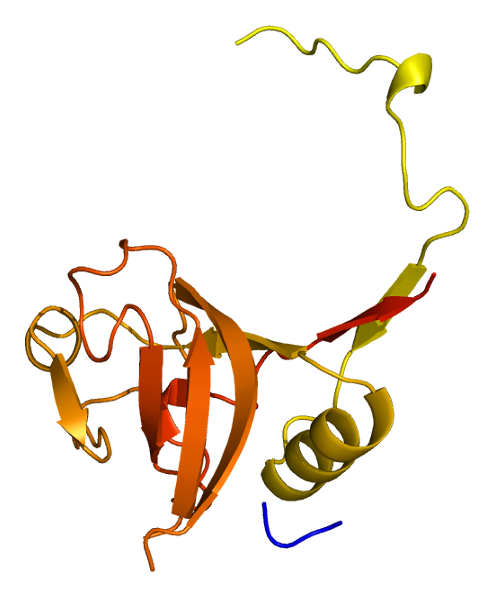

Identifiers
- Aliases: CTSL, CATL, CTSL1, MEP, cathepsin L
- External IDs: OMIM: 116880; GeneCards: CTSL
Available structures
PDB	Human UniProt search: PDBe RCSB
PDB	List of PDB id codes 1CJL, 1CS8, 1ICF, 1MHW, 2NQD, 2VHS, 2XU1, 2XU3, 2XU4, 2XU5, 2YJ2, 2YJ8, 2YJ9, 2YJB, 2YJC, 3BC3, 3H89, 3H8B, 3H8C, 3HHA, 3HWN, 3IV2, 3K24, 3KSE, 3OF8, 3OF9, 4AXL, 4AXM, 5F02, 5I4H
Enzyme activity
EC #	BRENDA	ExPASy	KEGG	MetaCyc
3.4.22.15	↗	↗	↗	↗

Gene location (Human)
Chr.	Chromosome 9 (human)
Band	9q21.33	Start	87,724,051 bp
Band	9q21.33	End	87,731,469 bp
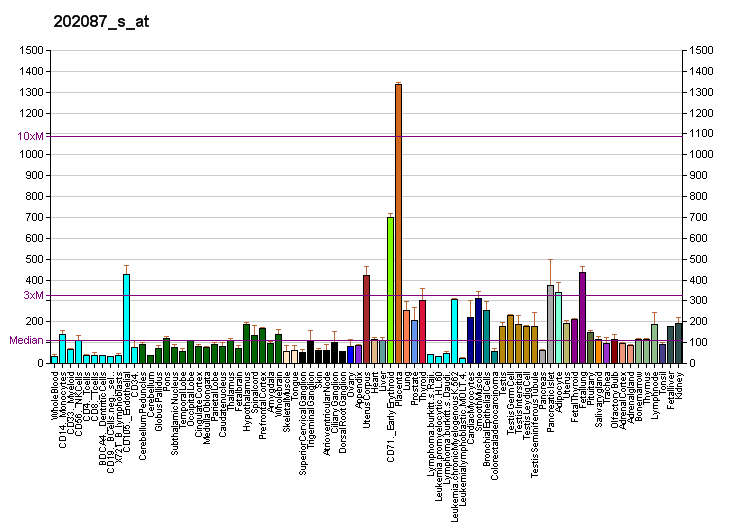
RNA expression pattern
Bgee	Human / Mouse (ortholog); Top expressed in: stromal cell of endometrium; decidua; islet of Langerhans; pericardium; gallbladder; upper lobe of left lung; left uterine tube; renal medulla; muscle layer of sigmoid colon; gastric mucosa / n/a; More reference expression data
BioGPS	More reference expression data
Gene ontology
Molecular function	fibronectin binding; cysteine-type peptidase activity; collagen binding; histone binding; serpin family protein binding; peptidase activity; protein binding; cysteine-type endopeptidase activity; hydrolase activity; proteoglycan binding; serine-type endopeptidase activity
Cellular component	extracellular region; endolysosome lumen; lysosomal lumen; lysosome; extracellular exosome; nucleus; extracellular space; collagen-containing extracellular matrix; multivesicular body; plasma membrane
Biological process	macrophage apoptotic process; antigen processing and presentation; adaptive immune response; antigen processing and presentation of exogenous peptide antigen via MHC class II; extracellular matrix disassembly; proteolysis; toll-like receptor signaling pathway; cellular response to thyroid hormone stimulus; collagen catabolic process; proteolysis involved in cellular protein catabolic process; regulation of keratinocyte differentiation
Sources:Amigo / QuickGO
Orthologs
Databases	NCBI: entry; OMA: entry
Species	Human	Mouse
Entrez	1514	n/a
Ensembl	ENSG00000135047	n/a
UniProt	P07711; Q9HBQ7	n/a
RefSeq (mRNA)	NM_001257971; NM_001257972; NM_001257973; NM_001912; NM_145918 NM_001382757; NM_001382758; NM_001382766; NM_001382767; NM_001382768	n/a
RefSeq (protein)	NP_001244900; NP_001244901; NP_001244902; NP_001903; NP_666023 NP_001369686; NP_001369687; NP_001369695; NP_001369696; NP_001369697; NP_001244902.1	n/a
Location (UCSC)	Chr 9: 87.72 – 87.73 Mb	n/a
PubMed search		n/a
- Wikidata
View/Edit Human

Cathepsin L1 (or just cathepsin L) is an enzyme that in humans is encoded by the CTSL gene (previously CTSL1). This enzyme is a cysteine cathepsin, a lysosomal cysteine protease that plays a major role in intracellular protein catabolism. Though there is only one known isozyme of Cathepsin L (EC 3.4.22.15) in humans, certain other animals like liver fluke have more than one protein that catalyze the same reaction.

== Function ==
Cathepsin L1 is a member of the Peptidase C1 (cathepsin) MEROPS family, which plays an important role in diverse processes including normal lysosome mediated protein turnover, antigen and proprotein processing, and apoptosis. Its substrates include collagen and elastin, as well as alpha-1 protease inhibitor, a major controlling element of neutrophil elastase activity. The encoded protein has been implicated in several pathologic processes, including myofibril necrosis in myopathies and in myocardial ischemia, and in the renal tubular response to proteinuria. This protein, which is a member of the peptidase C1 family, is a dimer composed of disulfide-linked heavy and light chains, both produced from a single protein precursor. At least two transcript variants encoding the same protein have been found for this gene.

=== Viral entry ===
Cleavage of the SARS-CoV-2 S2 spike protein required for viral entry into cells can be accomplished by proteases TMPRSS2 located on the cell membrane, or by cathepsins (primarily cathepsin L) in endolysosomes. Hydroxychloroquine inhibits the action of cathepsin L in endolysosomes, but because cathepsin L cleavage is minor compared to TMPRSS2 cleavage, hydroxychloroquine does little to inhibit SARS-CoV-2 infection.

=== Inflammation ===
Although Cathepsin L is usually characterized as a lysosomal protease, it can be secreted, resulting in pathological inflammation. Cathepsin L and other cysteine cathepsins tend to be secreted by macrophages and other tissue-invading immune cells when causing pathological inflammation.

== Interactions ==
CTSL1 has been shown to interact with Cystatin A.

== Distribution ==
Cathepsin L has been reported in many organisms including fish, birds, mammals, and sponges.

== See also ==
- Cathepsin L2 (also known as cathepsin V)
