= Cathepsin L2 =

Protein-coding gene in the species Homo sapiens

CTSV
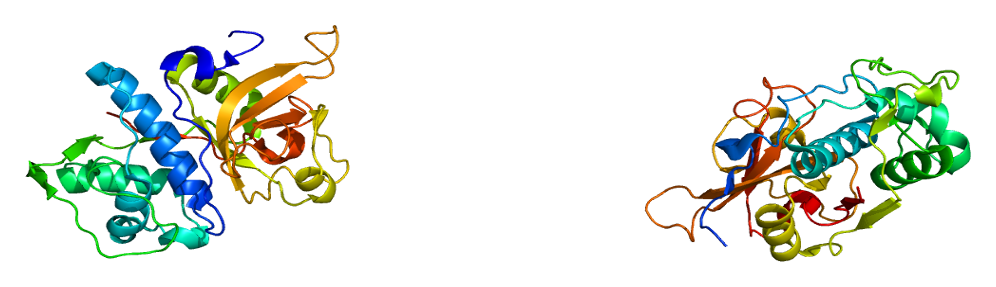

Identifiers
- Aliases: CTSV, cathepsin V, CATL2, CTSL2, CTSU
- External IDs: OMIM: 603308; MGI: 88564; GeneCards: CTSV
Available structures
PDB	Ortholog search: PDBe RCSB
PDB	List of PDB id codes 1FH0, 3H6S, 3KFQ
Enzyme activity
EC #	BRENDA	ExPASy	KEGG	MetaCyc
3.4.22.43	↗	↗	↗	↗

Gene location (Human)
Chr.	Chromosome 9 (human)
Band	9q22.33	Start	97,029,677 bp
Band	9q22.33	End	97,156,556 bp

Gene location (Mouse)
Chr.	Chromosome 13 (mouse)
Band	13 B3|13 33.26 cM	Start	64,507,151 bp
Band	13 B3|13 33.26 cM	End	64,518,704 bp
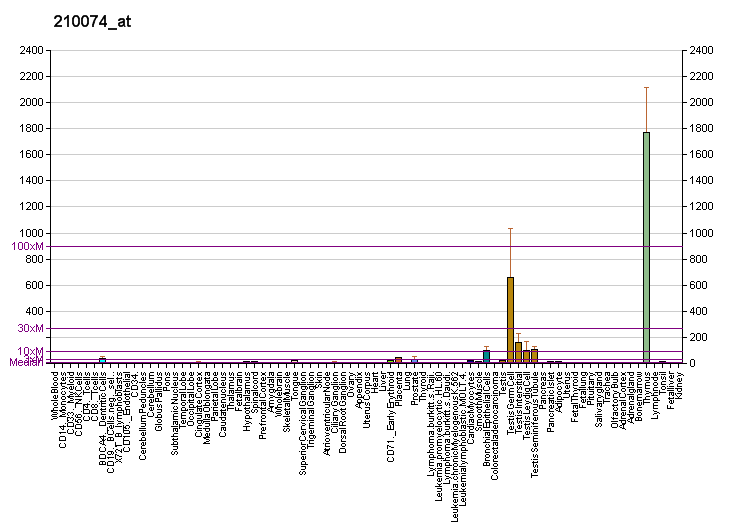
RNA expression pattern
Bgee	Human / Mouse (ortholog); Top expressed in: thymus; skin of arm; skin of thigh; oocyte; retinal pigment epithelium; amniotic fluid; secondary oocyte; hair follicle; vulva; gonad / Top expressed in: stroma of bone marrow; iris; epithelium of lens; decidua; endothelial cell of lymphatic vessel; gastrula; corneal stroma; ciliary body; efferent ductule; cumulus cell; More reference expression data
BioGPS	More reference expression data
Gene ontology
Molecular function	cysteine-type peptidase activity; peptide binding; peptidase activity; protein binding; aminopeptidase activity; hydrolase activity; serine-type endopeptidase activity; cysteine-type endopeptidase activity; cysteine-type carboxypeptidase activity; histone binding; kininogen binding; protein-containing complex binding
Cellular component	cytoplasm; perikaryon; apical part of cell; secretory granule; extracellular region; microvillus; vacuole; lysosomal lumen; neuron projection; lysosome; external side of plasma membrane; extracellular space; nucleus; nucleolus; cytoplasmic vesicle
Biological process	male gonad development; response to organic cyclic compound; antigen processing and presentation of exogenous peptide antigen via MHC class II; cellular response to starvation; extracellular matrix disassembly; response to glucocorticoid; response to glucose; Sertoli cell differentiation; response to gonadotropin; proteolysis; cell communication; decidualization; spermatogenesis; multicellular organism aging; proteolysis involved in cellular protein catabolic process; nerve development; autophagic cell death; response to odorant; regulation of keratinocyte differentiation; negative regulation of keratinocyte proliferation; protein processing; protein autoprocessing; hair follicle morphogenesis; regulation of actin cytoskeleton reorganization
Sources:Amigo / QuickGO
Orthologs
Databases	NCBI: entry; OMA: entry
Species	Human	Mouse
Entrez	1515	13039
Ensembl	ENSG00000136943	ENSMUSG00000021477
UniProt	O60911	P06797
RefSeq (mRNA)	NM_001333; NM_001201575	NM_009984
RefSeq (protein)	NP_001188504; NP_001324	NP_034114
Location (UCSC)	Chr 9: 97.03 – 97.16 Mb	Chr 13: 64.51 – 64.52 Mb
PubMed search
- Wikidata
View/Edit Human	View/Edit Mouse

Cathepsin L2 (EC 3.4.22.43, also known as cathepsin V or cathepsin U) is a protein encoded in humans by the CTSV gene.

The protein is a human cysteine cathepsin, a lysosomal cysteine protease with endopeptidase activity.

The protein is a member of the papain-like protease family (MEROPS family C1), a lysosomal cysteine protease with endopeptidase activity. It may play an important role in corneal physiology. This gene is expressed in colorectal and breast carcinomas but not in normal colon, mammary gland, or peritumoral tissues, suggesting a possible role for this gene in tumor processes.

== Clinical significance ==
Cathepsin L2 may play a role in the pathogenesis of keratoconus.
