= COVID-19 pandemic in Scotland =

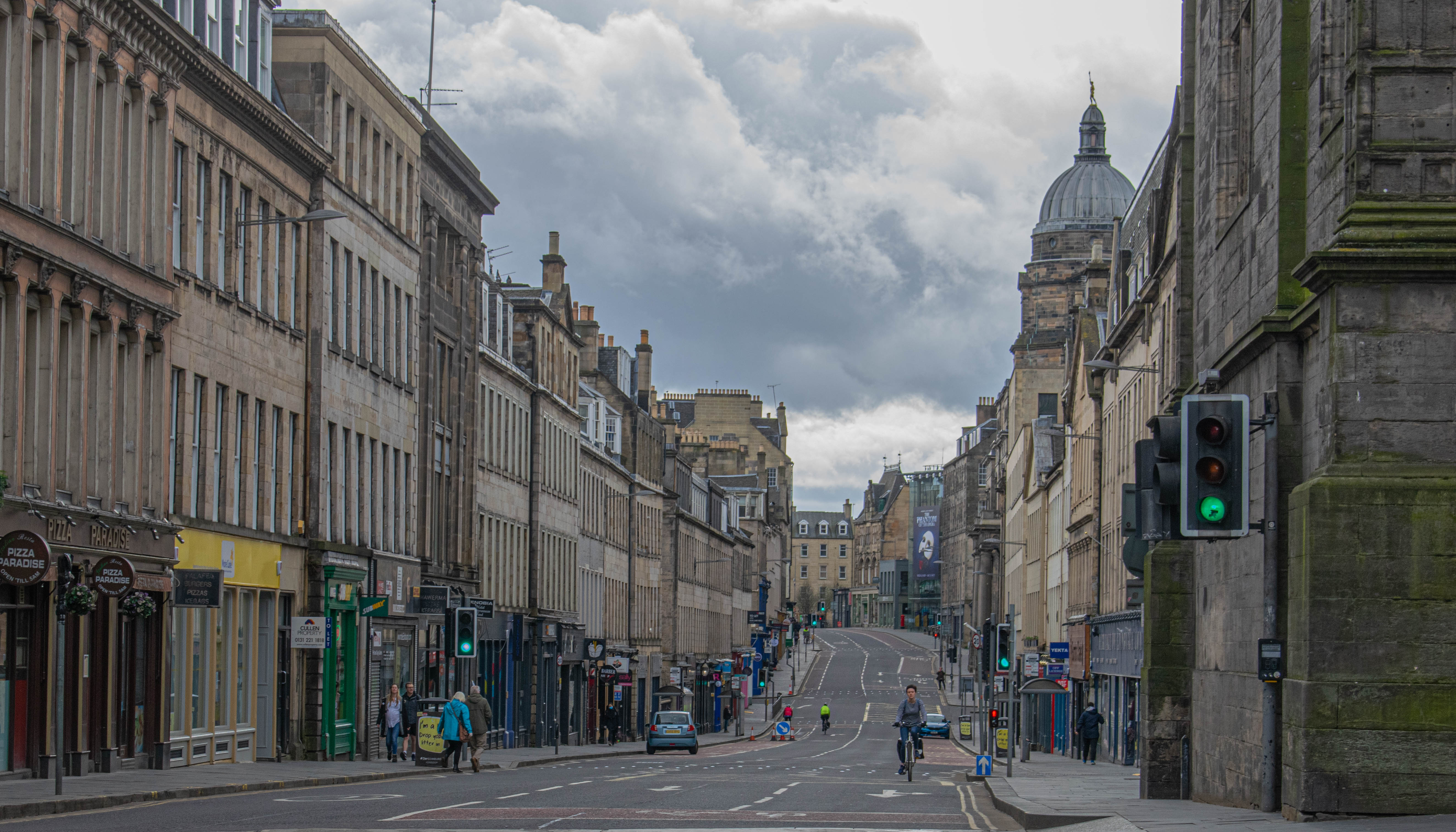
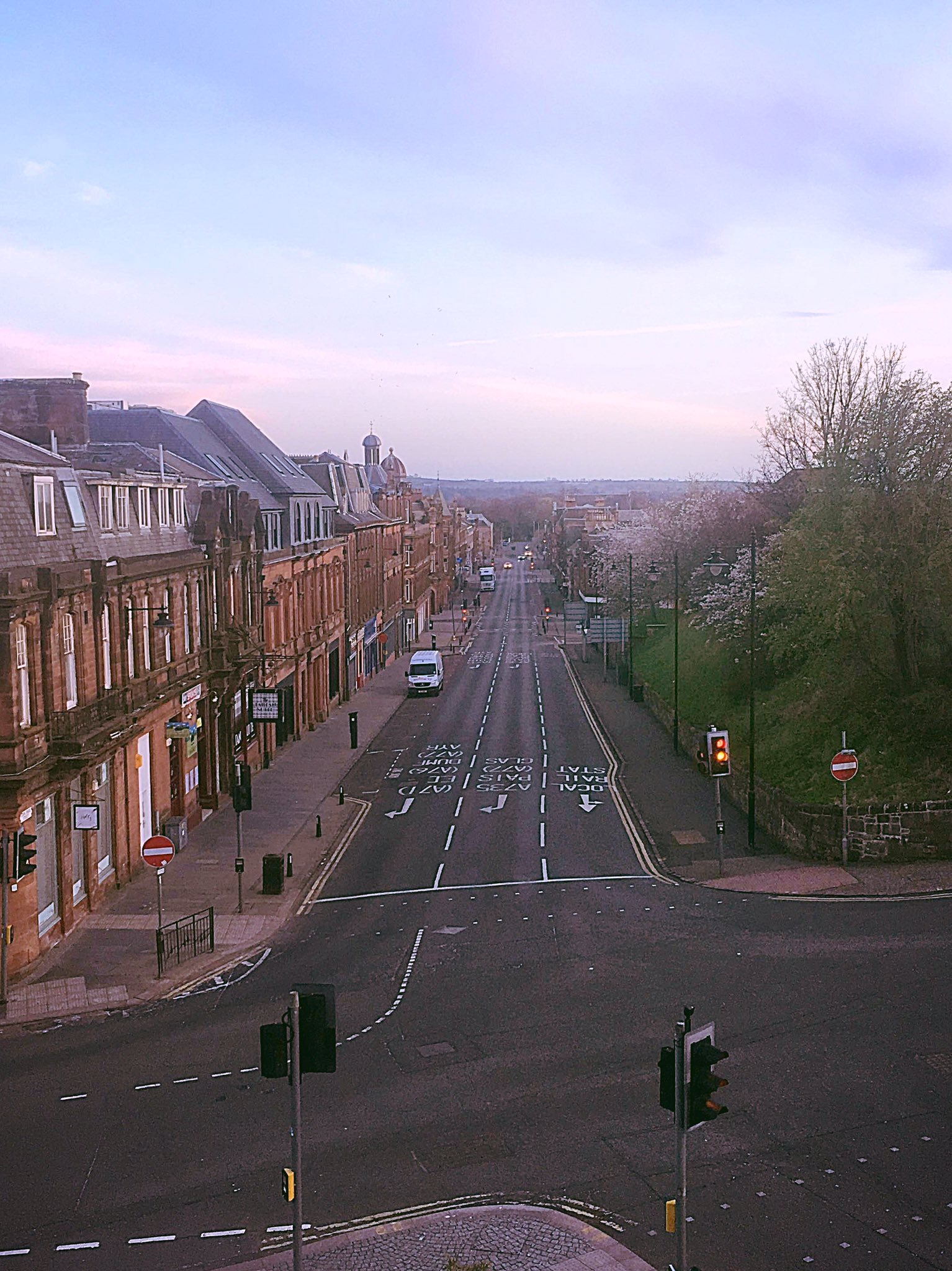
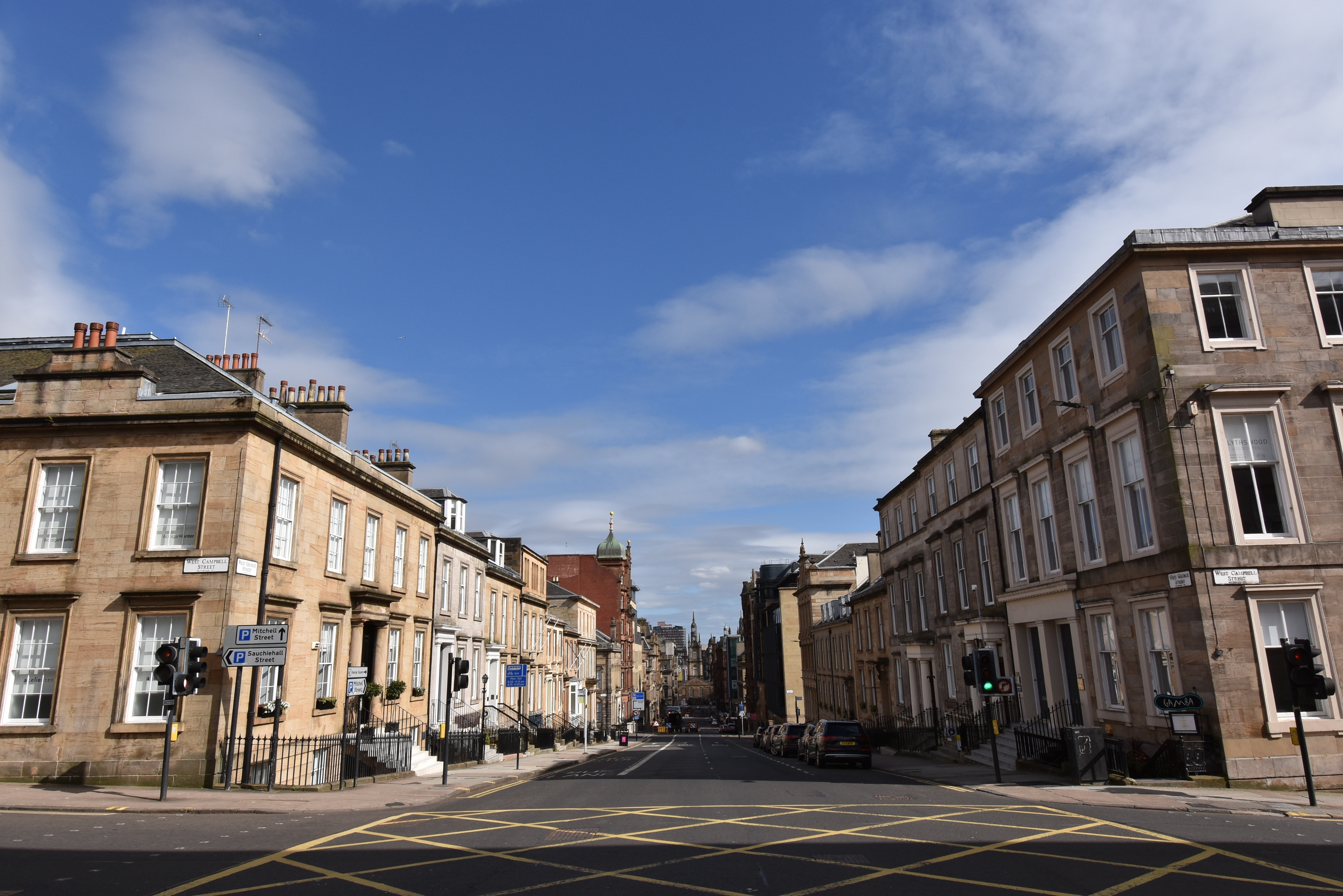
- (clockwise from top): South Bridge in Edinburgh; West George Street in Glasgow; John Finnie Street in Kilmarnock
- Disease: COVID-19
- Pathogen: SARS-CoV-2
- Location: Scotland
- First outbreak: Northern Italy (local); Wuhan, Hubei, China (global)
- Index case: Tayside
- Arrival date: 19 February 2020
- Confirmed cases: 217,127 (up to 28 March 2021)
- Deaths: 7,584 (deaths within 28 days of positive test, up to 28 March 2021); 10,078 (deaths with COVID-19 on the death certificate by date of death, up to 25 April 2021)
- Fatality rate: 137.6 (death rate per 100,000 who died within 28 days of the first positive test); 177.7 (death rate per 100,000 whose death certificate mentioned COVID-19)

Government website
- Scottish Government: Coronavirus in Scotland

The COVID-19 pandemic in Scotland is part of the COVID-19 pandemic of coronavirus disease-2019, caused by the virus SARS-CoV-2. The first case of COVID-19 was confirmed in Scotland on 1 March 2020. Community transmission was first reported on 11 March 2020, and the first confirmed death was on 13 March 2020.

COVID-19 became a notifiable disease in Scotland on 22 February 2020. The first cases were detected in Scotland in the following weeks. By 16 March and following the outbreak in Italy, and based on forecasting by epidemiologists at Imperial College London—the Scottish Government advised the public to avoid all "non-essential" travel and contact with others, and to remote work if possible. Those with symptoms, and their household, were asked to self-isolate. Pregnant women, the over 70s, and those with certain illnesses were asked to self-isolate for longer. On 20 March 2020, schools were told to close, along with pubs, cafes and cinemas. On 23 March 2020, a 'Stay at Home' order was announced; this would come to be referred to as the UK lockdown.

COVID-19 policies in Scotland began to diverge with those elsewhere in the UK as the first lockdown was lifted starting in April 2020. The Scottish government pursued a zero-COVID strategy aiming to eliminate the virus entirely in 2020, lifted lockdown rules more gradually than the other countries of the UK, and expanded testing capacity. Personal protective equipment supplies and guidance were major issues early in the outbreak. A four-tier restriction system that applied to different regions of Scotland came into force later in 2020, and a lockdown applying to the whole country applied from early 2021 as the Alpha variant spread from elsewhere in the UK. A vaccination programme began in December 2020. As many restrictions were lifted later in 2021, the Delta variant and Omicron variant began to pose further challenges and prompted responses in Scotland. By 6 November 2021, six cases of the Omicron variant had been detected in Scotland. In response, the health secretary advocated for the population to "redouble our efforts to follow the basic rules that have served us well throughout the pandemic".

Scottish healthcare service capacity was substantially reorganised in response to the outbreak and clinical studies into COVID-19 have also taken place in the country. The pandemic had a major impact across Scottish society. Care homes and healthcare were directly affected by the spread of the disease. Beyond that, it caused major disruptions to education, law enforcement and the economy.

== Background ==
On 12 January, the World Health Organization (WHO) confirmed that a novel coronavirus was the cause of a respiratory illness in a cluster of people in Wuhan, Hubei, China, who had initially come to the attention of the WHO on 31 December 2019. On 11 March 2020, the outbreak was declared a pandemic.

Unlike the SARS outbreak of 2003, the case fatality ratio for COVID-19 was much lower, but the transmission rate was significantly higher, with a death toll to reflect that.

On 24 January, the first tests for COVID-19 came back negative, with the then Chief Medical Officer Dr. Catherine Calderwood saying that the risk was low for the Scottish public; although she acknowledged that cases would arrive at some point. The first case was detected on 1 March and by 23 March, the country went into lockdown.

== Timeline ==
=== January–March 2020 ===
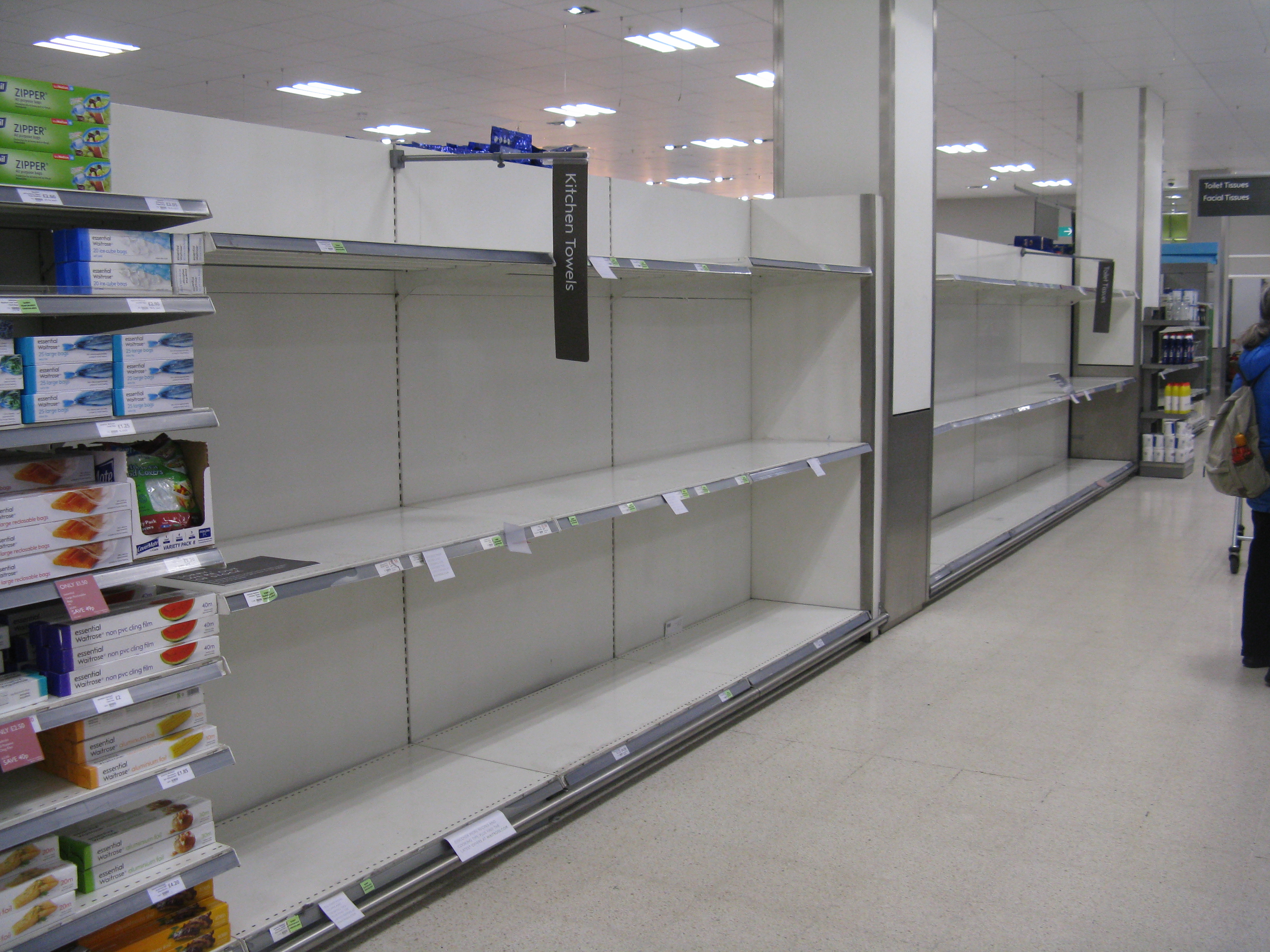
Kitchen roll and toilet roll sold out following panic buying at a supermarket in Morningside, Edinburgh.

- 24 January: Five people were tested for COVID-19 in Scotland, all returning negative as an incident team was established for the disease.
- 10 February: 57 tests had been conducted (all negatives), a figure which rose to 412 by 25 February.
- 22 February: COVID-19 was made into a "notifiable disease", and a surveillance network involving 41 GP locations was established to submit samples of suspected patients, even if they had no travel history.
- 26–27 February: Nike holds a conference in Edinburgh, which 70 people attend. Although Scottish residents at the conference contracted the virus a study by Glasgow University concluded it did not cause further spread across the country.
- 1 March: The first confirmed case of COVID-19 in Scotland was detected in Tayside. The person had then recently travelled to Italy. At that time, since the outbreak began in Wuhan, there had been 698 tests resulting negative for the disease.
- 4 March: Two further cases were confirmed, one having travelled from Italy and the other having had contact with a known carrier.
- 5 March: Three further cases were confirmed, totalling to 5 cases
- 6 March: The number of confirmed cases double to 11.
- 9 March: Cases had more than doubled again to 23 cases out of 2,101 tests conducted.
- 11 March: First case of community transmission which wasn't linked to travel or confirmed cases.
- 13 March: The first death from COVID-19 in Scotland was confirmed, of an elderly patient with underlying health conditions. At the time, 85 cases of the disease had been confirmed out of 3,314 tests conducted.
- 16 March: 171 cases had been confirmed from 4,895 tests, with positive cases being reported by all health boards of NHS Scotland except in NHS Orkney and NHS Western Isles.
- 20 March: The Scottish Government told cafes, pubs, and restaurants to close. (Note: Beyond these 3 types of establishments, also told to close were: Nightclubs and other drinking establishments; Cinemas, theatres and bingo halls and concert halls; Spas, wellness centres and massage parlours; Casinos and betting shops; Indoor leisure facilities such as gyms and swimming pools)
- 23 March: With the UK death toll hitting 335 deaths and 14 in Scotland, Boris Johnson announced a nationwide 'Stay at Home' order would come into effect as of midnight and it would be reviewed every 3 weeks. Former CMO Catherine Calderwood said, "This is no longer a rehearsal for something that might happen." This would become known as the UK lockdown.
- 24 March: 16 patients with confirmed cases of COVID-19 had died.
- 25 March: The First Minister confirmed that the Scottish Government was establishing a COVID-19 Advisory group to supplement the advice it was receiving from the UK-wide Scientific Advisory Group on Emergencies. It was to be chaired by Professor Andrew Morris of Edinburgh University, the Director of Health Research UK, with support from vice chair David Crossman, who is the Dean of Medicine at the University of St Andrews and Chief Scientific Advisor for Health at the Scottish Government
- 26 March: It was announced that 25 deaths had been reported, with 896 confirmed cases in Scotland.
- 28 March: 3 Scottish woman set up Run For Heroes, a fundraising campaign that asked you to run 5k, donate £5 and nominate 5 others. The campaign went onto raise £7 million for NHS Charities COVID-19 Appeal and was the biggest viral fundraiser in the UK.
- 31 March: two cases in NHS Western Isles and one in NHS Orkney mean that COVID-19 cases have now been recorded in all of Scotland's health board areas.

=== April to June 2020 ===
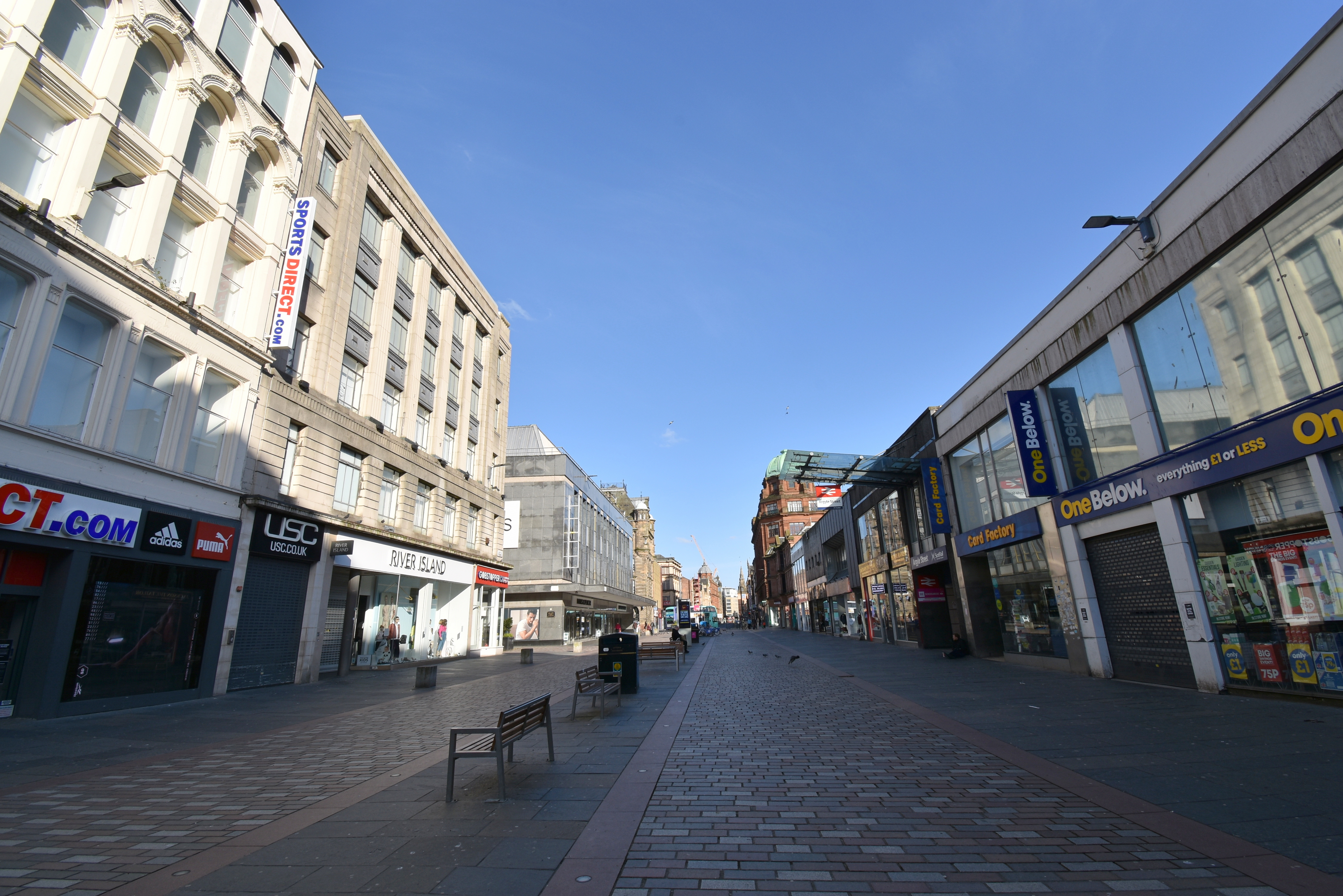
Glasgow. Argyle Street during COVID-19 lockdown, one of the main shopping streets in the city centre. 7 April 2020.

- 1 April: Confirmed Cases of COVID-19 passed 2000 across the country, with 76 deaths in hospitals. The Scottish Government announced 3,500 tests a day by the end of the month and construction started on the SEC in Glasgow to become NHS Louisa Jordan Hospital which would hold 300 beds, expandable to 1,000.
- 5 April: Despite initially saying she would stay in office, Scotland's chief medical officer, Dr Catherine Calderwood, resigned after making two trips to her second home, breaking the COVID-19 lockdown she and First Minister Sturgeon had encouraged.
- 6 April: The Coronavirus (Scotland) Act 2020 which was introduced as an Emergency Bill in the Scottish Parliament on 31 March 2020 gained Royal Assent, becoming law.
- 7 April: The Scottish Government announced that 12,000 nursing and midwifery students from across the country and returning workers who had worked in the Health and Social Care sector had signed up to join the NHS workforce to help fight COVID-19, Chief Nursing Officer Fiona McQueen said, "I want to thank each and every student who has volunteered their support so far." In addition, 2,000 final year students had already joined the workforce since the call for help was sent out.
- 16 April: After reviewing the lockdown with all nations in the UK, the decision was made to extend it for another 3 weeks until the 7 May. First Minister Nicola Sturgeon in her daily briefing said, ". . . I want to stress that the news is positive . . . Early indications are that the lockdown restrictions have resulted in a slowing down in the rate of community transmission of the virus."
- 20 April: NHS Louisa Jordan in Glasgow opened as confirmed cases passed 8,400 with 915 fatalities in hospitals.
- 22 April: The National Records of Scotland (NRS) released data up to 19 April. The number of deaths in Scotland was up 80% above the 5-year average. 537 deaths had been recorded in care homes, double the number of the previous week, 910 deaths had been recorded in hospitals, and 168 deaths in homes or other settings. Public Health Scotland's daily figures were under-counting deaths by up to 40%. (Note: Deaths in Scotland with COVID-19 mentioned as a cause: 910 in hospitals (57%); 537 in care homes (33%); 168 in homes and other settings (10%)) as it was reporting deaths in hospitals only.
- 25 April: Confirmed cases surpassed 10,000.
- 27 April 2020: more than 22,000 former staff and students had volunteered to join or rejoin the healthcare and social care services in Scotland since the epidemic began,
- 28 April: First Minister Nicola Sturgeon advised the voluntary use of (non-medical grade) cloth face masks to be used in enclosed spaces such as shops and public transport, but not generally in public, excluding those who are under two years old or who have respiratory illnesses such as asthma. However, Sturgeon noted their limitation and said that co-operation with the face mask guidance was voluntary.
- 1 May: Confirmed cases of COVID-19 passed 11,500 across the country, with 1515 deaths in hospitals. The Scottish Government announced that it had reached its testing goal of 3,500 tests a day in NHS labs laid out in April with 4,661 tests carried out on 30 April. They also announced that their next target was 8,000 tests a day in NHS labs across Scotland by Mid-May.
- 8 May: First Minister Nicola Sturgeon reported that there was some recognition that each of the four nations of the UK might move at different speeds with regard to loosening the lockdown and that she would not be pressured into lifting restrictions prematurely.
- 9 May: The Scottish Ambulance Service (SAS) made 242 attendances for suspected COVID-19, and took 157 people to hospital with suspected COVID-19. By 9 May 2020 there had been 4,503 cumulative cases of suspected COVID-19 in care homes and up to 3,672 staff had reported as absent in adult care homes due to COVID-19, representing 8.5% of all adult care home staff (43,403) for whom figures had been provided.
- 10 May: Prime Minister Boris Johnson unveiled an exit strategy and an easing of the lockdown rules in England. First Minister Nicola Sturgeon in her daily briefing criticised the government for their new slogan, 'Stay Alert, Control the Virus, Save Lives' saying it wasn't clear and she asked the UK Government not to promote their 'Stay Alert' advertising campaign in Scotland. Sturgeon eased exercising outside to more than once a day but the public would still have to maintain social distancing at all times. She also stressed leisure activities such as sunbathing, picnics and barbecues were still prohibited.
- 11 May: In a national address to Scotland on the beginning of the seventh week of lockdown, Nicola Sturgeon asked the nation "to stick with lockdown for a bit longer - so that we can consolidate our progress, not jeopardise it[...] I won't risk unnecessary deaths by acting rashly or prematurely." This marked the moment when the four nations of the UK took different strategies on handling lockdown and lifting it eventually, with Wales and Northern Ireland also continuing the 'Stay at Home' slogan. England adopted the slogan 'Stay Alert' and began to lift restrictions. By 11 May 2020 a total of 101,122 COVID-19 tests had been carried out by NHS Scotland labs in hospitals, care homes or the community. In addition there were a total of 27,647 drive through and mobile tests carried out by Regional Testing Centres in Scotland.
- 18 May: Anyone aged 5 or over, presenting symptoms of COVID-19 became eligible to get tested and Anosmia was added to the COVID-19 symptom list. Nicola Sturgeon announced her plans to begin easing lockdown from 28 May and a roadmap will be published on 21 May.
- 21 May: First Minister Nicola Sturgeon outlined a four-phase "route map" for easing lockdown restrictions in Scotland that included allowing people to meet up outside with people from one other household in the first phase. The lockdown would be eased from 28 May subject to the number of new cases of COVID-19 continuing to fall. Schools in Scotland would reopen on 11 August, when students would receive a "blended model" of part-time study at school combined with some learning at home.
- 28 May: First Minister Nicola Sturgeon announced an easing of the lockdown in Scotland from the following day, with people able to meet friends and family outside in groups of no more than eight but keeping two metres apart.
- 8 June: A route map for easing restrictions was published by the Scottish Government.
- 19 June: Some easing of lockdown restrictions with meeting outdoors of up to 8 people from two other households whilst maintaining social distancing, for single people or singles with children they may meet with another household indoors without social distancing. Face coverings mandatory on public transport. Exercise within 5 miles of home.
- 29 June: Further easing of lockdown with indoor workplaces allowed to open, street access retail and outdoor markets opening, outdoor sports playgrounds, zoos and parks open, outdoor marriages allowed and people can move house. All with social distancing.

=== July to September 2020 ===
- 3 July: The 5 mile travel ban is lifted, self contained holiday accommodation may re-open for business, visits to care homes by one "key visitor" are permitted but meetings must be outdoors and a 2m distance maintained, young people under 12 do not need to social distance and 12-17 year olds may meet in groups of up to 8 people provided social distancing is maintained. Beer gardens and outdoor cafes can open from 6 July. It will be compulsory to wear face coverings in shops from 10 July.
- 10 July: Air Bridge system starts which will not require self isolation for people returning from any of 57 countries, similar to, but less than the list of Air Bridges from England and Wales. Up to 15 people from five different households may meet outdoors whilst maintaining 2m social distancing, up to 8 people from three households may meet indoors and people from outside a household may stay overnight.
- 10 July: Scottish Government ministers call for the British Government to sign up to the EU's vaccine programme. Following reports that Britain would procure its own vaccines independently of Brussels, Mike Russell, Cabinet Secretary for the Constitution, Europe and External Affairs, said: "This idiotic refusal is all about Brexit and nothing to do with the pandemic. It will cost lives." Housing Minister Kevin Stewart and Children's Minister Maree Todd also strongly expressed their concerns.
- 11 August: Pupils return to schools. They do not need to socially distance but teachers have to wear masks if they are in close proximity with others and socially distance from each other. Initially no pupils had to wear face masks.
- 31 August: Pupils at high schools are obliged to wear face masks in corridors, canteens and other communal areas.
- 11 September: NHS Protect Scotland app released to the public for use on iOS and Android devices, using the Exposure Notifications System developed by Apple and Google. This app provides anonymous, Bluetooth-enabled contact tracing for all users in Scotland who opt-in to the service.
- 22 September: First Minister Nicola Sturgeon announces nationwide restrictions which go into effect on Friday 25 September, these restrictions affect the pub closing times to meetings within households.
- 23 September: 486 new confirmed cases were recorded in the previous 24 hours - the highest daily total since the start of the outbreak.
- 24 September: 124 students at Glasgow University tested positive for the virus, causing 600 students to go into self-isolation.

=== October to December 2020 ===
- 1 October: Margaret Ferrier, MP for the Rutherglen and Hamilton West constituency, was suspended by her party (SNP) and referred herself to the police and the Parliamentary standards authorities after it became known that she had travelled from Scotland to Westminster the previous weekend despite awaiting the outcome of a COVID-19 test having experienced symptoms, and when notified that the test result was positive for the virus, still chose to travel home again by train, in clear breach of guidelines.
- 5 October: As a further 697 cases of the COVID-19 are reported, with 218 people as inpatients and 22 in intensive care, the First Minister of Scotland is set to meet advisers to discuss new measures, including the possibility of a two-week "circuit breaker" to stem the escalation of cases.
- 2 November: A new, 5 level, or "tier" system is introduced into Scotland - bringing new, targeted restrictions to different regions of the country.
- 2 November: Pupils in the senior phase of Scottish education (S4-S6) must wear face masks in classrooms in addition to communal areas if the school is in level 3 or 4.
- 3 November: A poll by Survation and Scotland in Union shows that 56% of Scots think the Scottish Government and UK Government should work more closely on tackling COVID-19.
- 16 November: Bill introduced to the Scottish Parliament which, if passed, would extend the amount of time people can send postal ballots, dissolve the Scottish Parliament 1 day before the election, allow Scottish Ministers to make the election fully postal and hold polling over a few days, make the date for the first meeting of the new Scottish Parliament and election of the Presiding Officer flexible and postpone the date of the election by 6 months. Election matters are a reserved power, which only the UK Parliament holds, so this Bill would give this power to the Presiding Officer of the Scottish Parliament.
- 19 November: Health Secretary Jeane Freeman gives a statement to the Scottish Parliament on vaccines. She announces that Scotland is ready to administer the first vaccine for COVID-19 in the first week in February, if the vaccine is given safety clearance. Freeman also announced the priorities list for the first wave of vaccinations, which will run from December to February 2021. The priorities are: "frontline health and social care staff, older residents in care homes, care home staff, all those aged 80 and over, unpaid carers and personal assistants & those delivering the vaccination."
- 20 November: 11 council areas move to level 4 and cross-border (Scotland-England) non-essential travel is made illegal.
- 24 November: The 4 UK nations announce a coordinated plan for Christmas. Three households would be allowed to meet indoors, at a place of worship and outdoors for a space of 5 days (23–27 December) and travel restrictions would be eased. The so-called 'Christmas Bubbles' would not be able to visit bars or restaurants.
- 19 December: Following an outbreak of a mutant strain of COVID-19 in Wales, South East England, and along with seventeen cases of the new strain in Scotland, the coordinated plan for Christmas was cancelled across Britain. Shortly after Boris Johnson announced similar new restrictions in England, Nicola Sturgeon announced a travel ban to other parts of the United Kingdom. A sole exception is provided for Christmas Day, scrapping the previously planned 5 day relief from travel restrictions. Three weeks of level four restrictions are planned, and return of schools is postponed to 11 January.
- 19 December: Nicola Sturgeon apologises to the Scottish Parliament and people after a photo of her not wearing a mask inside, while chatting to a group of women, appears on the front page of The Scottish Sun. Sturgeon said there were "no excuses" and that she was "kicking myself very hard" for breaking the law.

=== January to June 2021 ===
- 12 January: Scotland's government has ordered people not to leave their home for any non-essential purpose. Only those living in tier 3 areas, including the Scottish islands, can go outside home. Also, travellers entering Scotland have to stay in self-isolation for 10 days after arrival.
- 10 February: BBC News reports that one million Scots had received at least the first dose of a COVID-19 vaccine. The government estimated that over the subsequent five days, all of the individuals in top priority groups (including those over the age of 70) would be inoculated.
- 17 February: Audit Scotland publishes a report that concludes the Scottish Government had not prepared adequately for a pandemic. While it commends the authorities for preventing hospitals from becoming overwhelmed during the crisis, the watchdog also notes that recommendations from pandemic planning exercises in 2015, 2016 and 2018 had not been fully implemented. One particular problem it highlights is that not enough had been done to ensure Scottish hospitals and care homes had enough personal protective equipment . Overall, it concludes that ministers "could have been better prepared to respond to the Covid-19 pandemic". Nicola Sturgeon says there are "lots of lessons to learn".
- 23 February: The Scottish Government published the Strategic Framework of proposals to gradually lift lockdown restrictions.
- 21 April: The Scottish Government changes its position on the EU vaccine programme, after Nicola Sturgeon says her preference is for Scotland to be part of the UK programme, even if the country becomes independent. Speaking at election husting, Sturgeon accuses Scottish Conservative leader Douglas Ross of "talking down our vaccination programme" when he said its success was partly due to the British Government's vaccine procurement. Ross ripostes: "You cannot ignore the fact that in Scotland over 60% of people, from yesterday's figures, have received the first dose of the vaccine and I was just looking at the European figures where the average is 20.5%."
- 19 June: The Scottish Government announces a ban on travel to Greater Manchester. Mayor Andy Burnham queries why travel to his city has been banned when it has a case rate of 323 per 100,000 people, while travel is still permitted to Dundee - which has a case rate of 317 per 100,000. He demands compensation for affected residents, claims that no one in the Scottish Government called him prior to the announcement and accuses Nicola Sturgeon of "treating the north of England with... contempt in bringing that in without any consultation with us."

=== July 2021 to January 2022 ===
- 4 July: The World Health Organisation finds that six out of Europe's ten virus hotspots are in Scotland. Tayside tops the list with 1,002 cases per 100,000 head of population over the previous fortnight. Labour's Health spokeswoman Jackie Baillie accuses the Scottish Government of being in "disarray". Former BBC journalist Brian Taylor comments: "I long to see a particular Dundonian team at the top of the league but not when that team is NHS Tayside and the table records the rapid spread of this malevolent disease."
- 8 July: As cases surge, the Scottish Government is accused of being 'missing in action' as it emerges First Minister Nicola Sturgeon, Deputy First Minister John Swinney and Health Minister Humza Yousaf are all on holiday. The SNP say Sturgeon has not had a break since the pandemic began and "remains fully in charge". Yousaf says he promised to take his stepdaughter to Harry Potter World, tweeting that: "Most important job I have is being a good father, step-father & husband to my wife and kids. In the last seven months they've had virtually no time from me."
- 9 August: Scotland moves beyond level 0, with most legal restrictions becoming gone or advisory, face mask rules and rules on hand hygiene and ventilation remain,
- 18 August: The annual Government Expenditure and Revenue Scotland (GERS) report reveals that Scotland's budget deficit has more than doubled during the course of the pandemic. While public spending rose, tax revenue in Scotland fell to £62.8 billion, resulting in a record budget deficit of 22.4% of GDP in 2020–21, with the UK as a whole recording a deficit of 14.2%. The state spent £18,144 on average per Scot - £1,828 higher than the UK average. Finance Secretary Kate Forbes says the figures are "not an obstacle" to independence and adds that: "It was inevitable given the scale of the policy response that all countries would emerge from the pandemic with high fiscal deficits." Scottish Labour's Deputy Leader Jackie Baillie says: "The additional £1,828 spent per person in Scotland compared to the rest of the UK is what goes to maintaining the schools, transport and NHS on which we all rely... No credible politician can look at these figures and believe Scotland would be anything but weaker outside the Union." The Institute for Fiscal Studies concludes that, while the deficit is likely to drop as the pandemic ends, an independent Scotland would start life with a large structural deficit and would likely need to raise taxes and cut spending.
- September 2021 SAGE was reporting that it was considered uncertain as more people went back to work and schools were returning and other changes were being made.
- 5 October: Nicola Sturgeon apologies to the Scottish people after the launch of Scotland's COVID-19 vaccine passport app does not go as planned. The app does not work for many people and Sturgeon said the situation was "deeply regrettable". Opposition politicians label the launch "shambolic".
- 9 October: Emails released under a Freedom of Information request reveal that the Scottish Government decided to keep Scots in the dark about an outbreak of COVID-19 at a Nike conference during the early stages of the pandemic. Nicola Sturgeon's Chief of Staff, Liz Lloyd, sent an email on 5 March 2020 urging full public disclosure; however, the following day Dr Catherine Calderwood, then the chief medical officer, said that to do so would represent a breach of patient confidentiality. Labour MP Ian Murray said the decision not to warn the public about the outbreak put lives at risk: "Had the Scottish Government taken urgent containment action after the first outbreak in Edinburgh, thousands of lives could have been saved from COVID-19. Instead, Nicola Sturgeon tried to cover up the outbreak, refusing to inform the public that more than two dozen people had been infected at a Nike conference in the capital." The Scottish Government said: "All appropriate steps were taken to ensure public health was protected following the Nike conference, with more than 60 contacts traced in Scotland, and around 50 others traced in England."
- 14 October On average, a total of 2,405 cases were reported in the 7 days prior to 14 October. This is similar to average cases (2,401) on 7 October.
- 22 October An average of 2,541 cases were reported. 325 weekly cases per 100,000 people of the population were reported in the week to 18 October (by specimen date). This is lower than the most recent peak (825 weekly cases per 100,000 on 6 September) and lower than the peak in July (425 weekly cases per 100,000 recorded on 3 July).
- 5 November An average of 2,786 cases were reported. Case rates had decreased for those in the 60-79 and 80+ year groups, and had increased slightly for other age bands.
- 25 November An average of 2,835 cases were reported in the previous seven days, marking a 7% decrease from the daily average of 3,034 recorded on 17 November.
- 14 December: Scotland announces additional social mixing guidelines, urging residents to limit social mixing to no more than three households, although clarifying that this would not apply on Christmas Day.
- 18 December: Journalist Michael Blackley asks Sturgeon at a press briefing whether she has considered cutting the self isolation period to help with staff shortages and if more money could be made available to businesses affected by the new restrictions. Sturgeon replies: "Yeah that'd really help – that would spread infection even further and that would be not doing any favours for businesses. I don't know if you've listened to a single word I've said, Michael. I don't think it's enough. But we've found £100m out of a fixed Budget, having to take that from elsewhere... every penny we now take, I don't know where you think I should take it from. The health service? The education budget? The justice budget?" Conservative MP Andrew Bowie says Sturgeon's response to Blackley is "arrogant, disrespectful and downright dismissive".
- 18 December: The Herald reports that the Scottish Parliament is likely to be recalled before the New Year to allow Sturgeon to update MSPs on Covid restrictions. Sturgeon denies the story and tweets that she has, "No idea what basis of this headline is, and it's not helpful to add to anxiety people already feel."
- 21 December: It is announced that the Scottish Parliament will be recalled on 29 December to allow Sturgeon to update MSPs on Covid restrictions.
- 26/27 December: Various new restrictions are introduced in relation to the spread Omicron variant, these consist of the limits on the number of people that can meet in certain settings and the reintroduction of social settings in certain public spaces.
- 30 December: Sturgeon announces that an additional £107 million has been found to support business affected by Covid restrictions.
- 5 January: Sturgeon announces that the time Scots must self-isolate for will be cut from 10 days to seven to help ease staff shortages. Sturgeon says she had taken into account the "burden of self-isolation on the economy".
- 18 January: Sturgeon announces that the restrictions introduced over Christmas in relation to the Omicron wave of the virus will be rolled back on 24 January.
- January 2022 SAGE reported that hospital admissions including ICU rates were reducing.
- 16 February: The Scottish government confirmed that all children aged five to eleven will receive COVID-19 vaccinations. The Scottish decision comes after the Welsh devolved government said on 15 February that it would follow unpublished advice from the Joint Committee for Vaccination and Immunization (JCVI) and vaccinate all children in that age range.
- 22 February: Nicola Sturgeon announces that Scotland's vaccine passport scheme would end on 28 February and all legal restrictions would be removed on 21 March.

== Government response plan ==
Key government officials

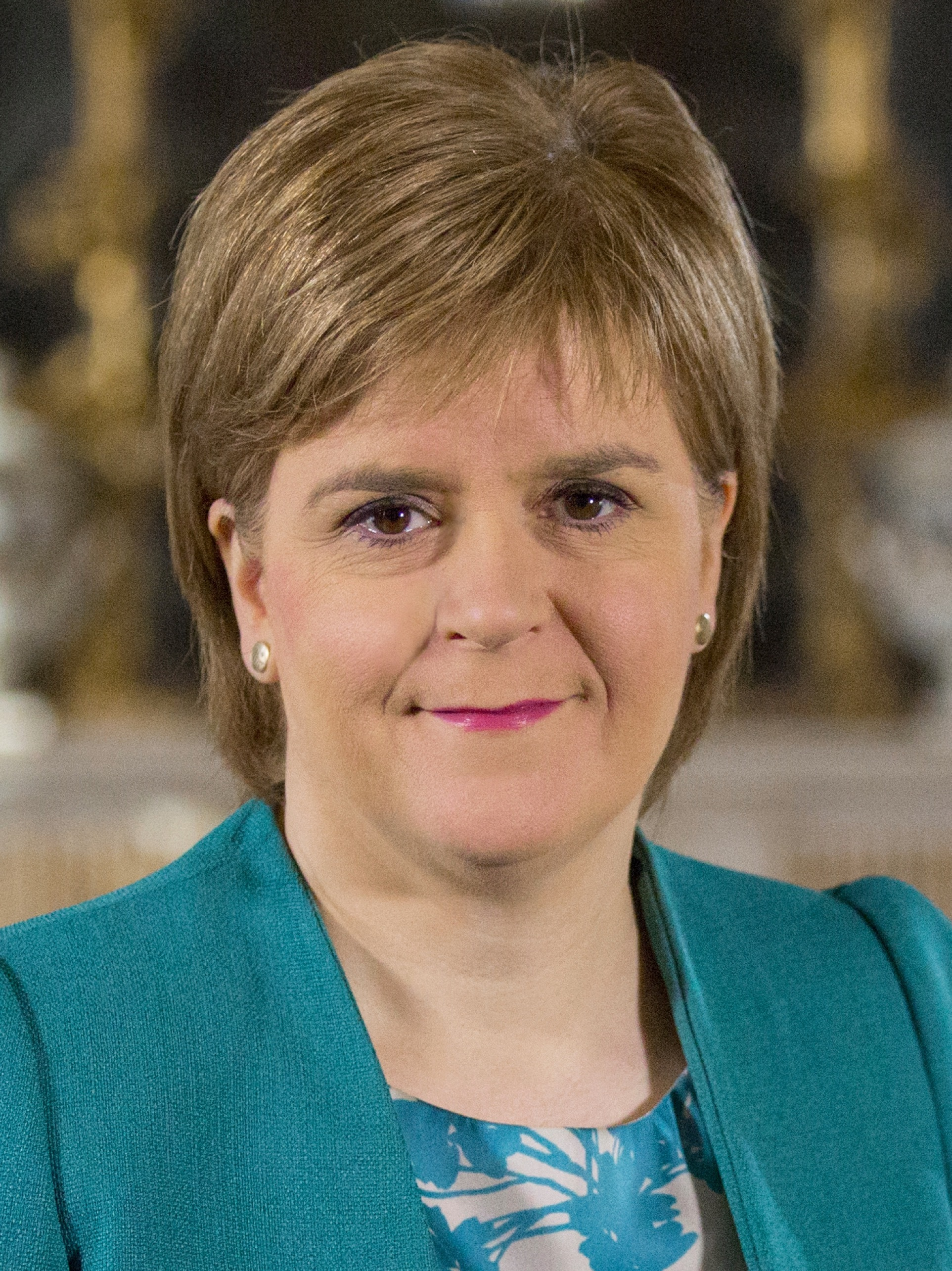
Nicola Sturgeon,
First Minister of Scotland

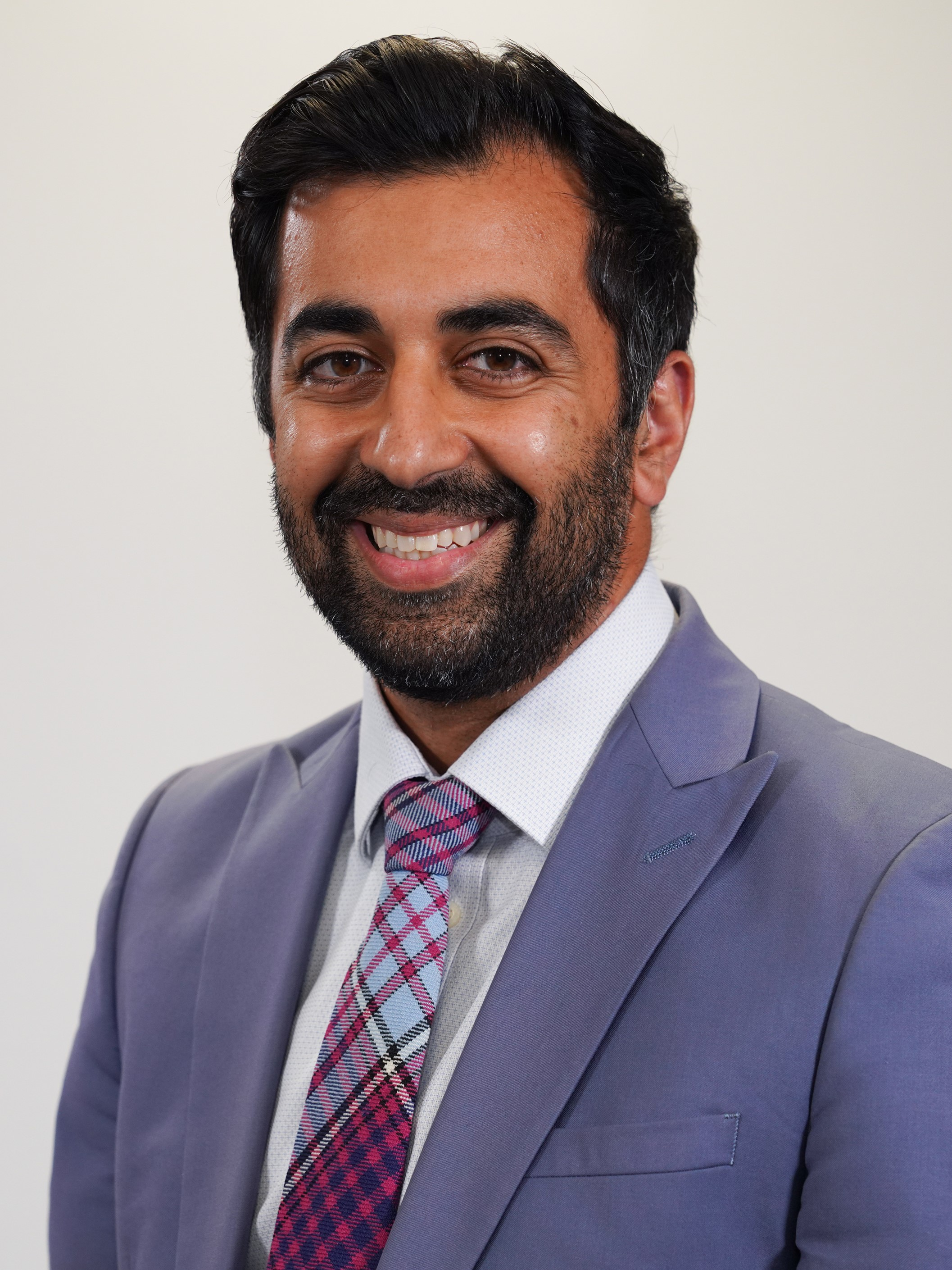
Humza Yousaf,
Cabinet Secretary for Health

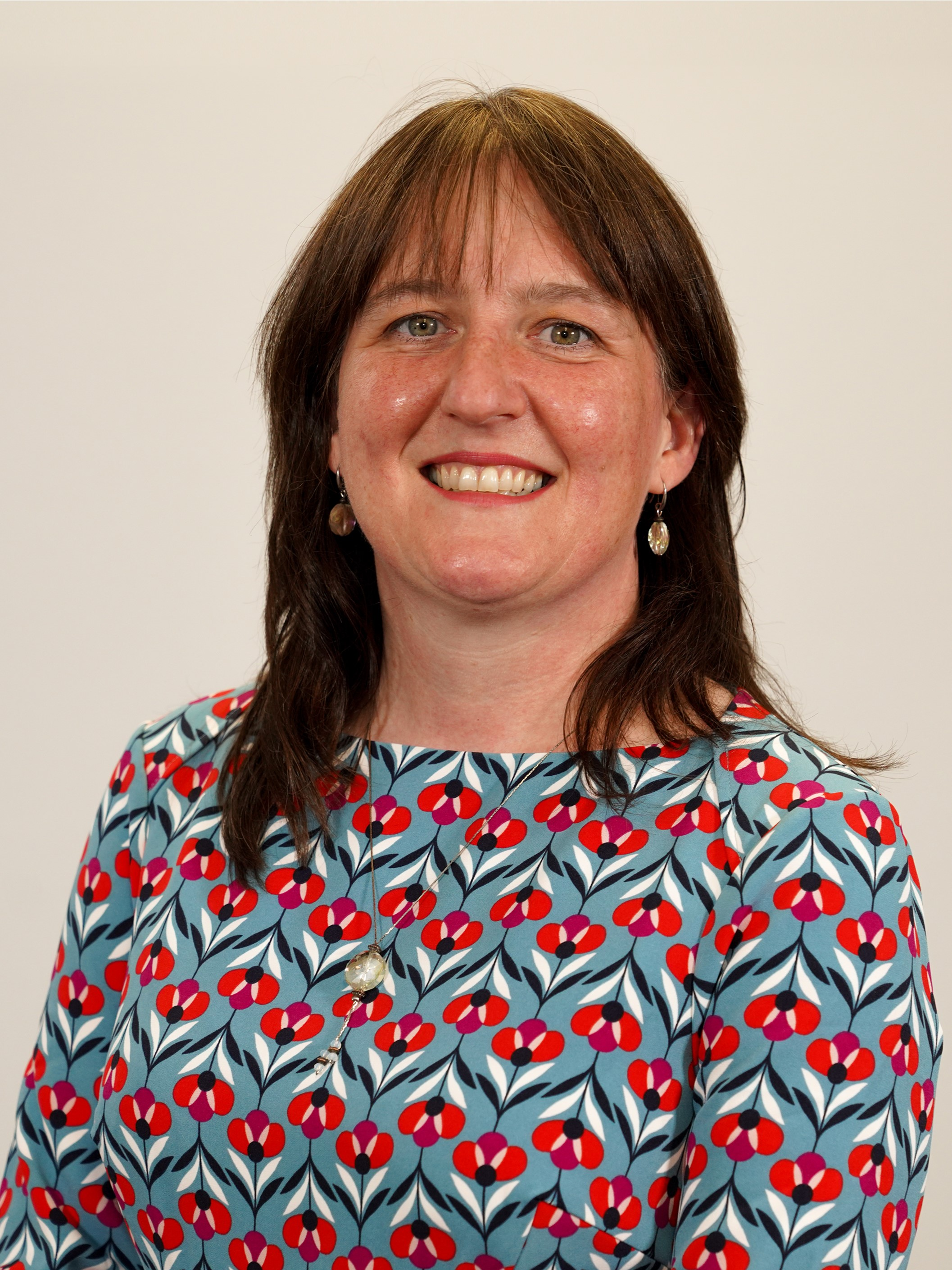
Maree Todd,
Minister for Public Health

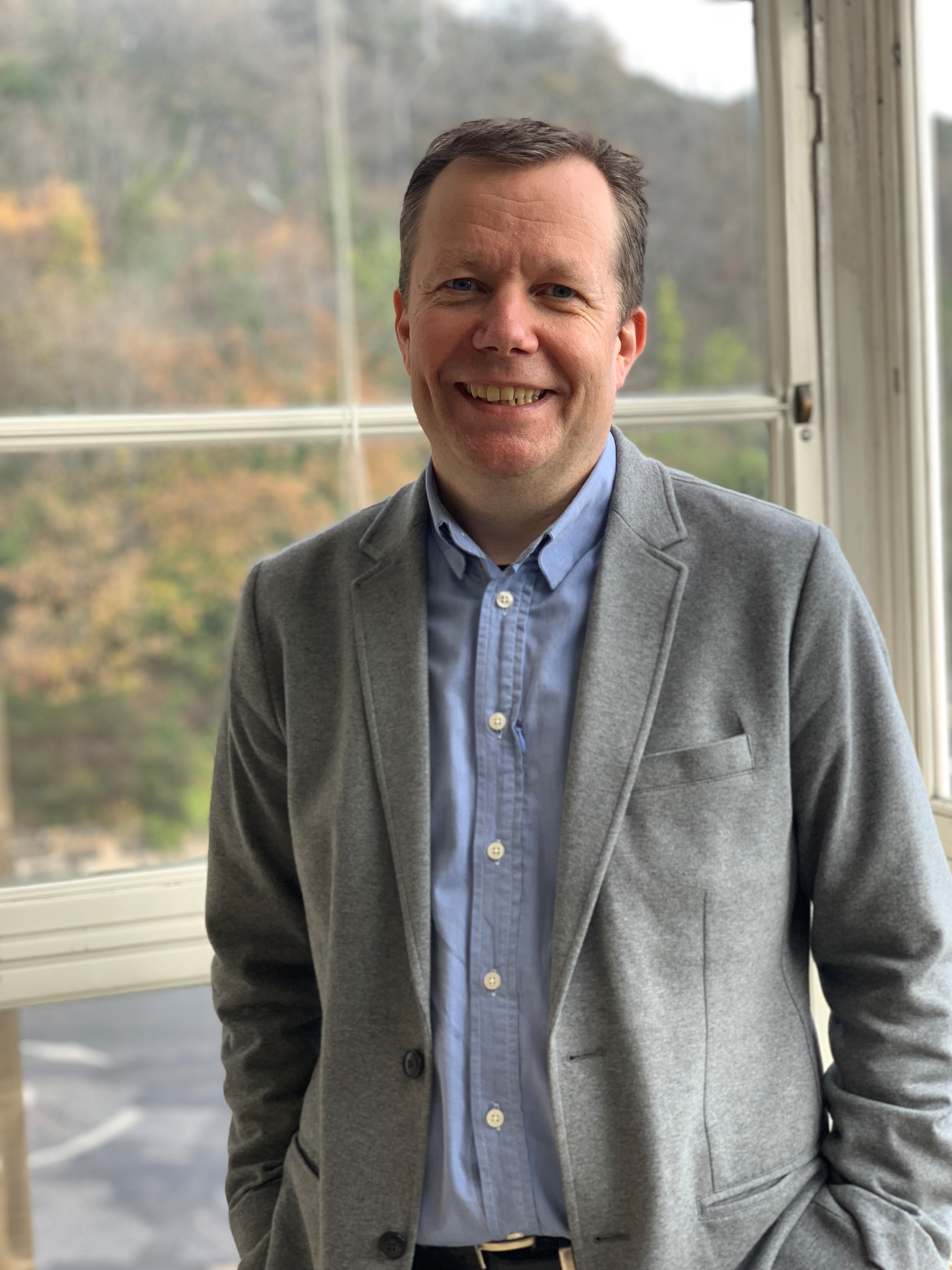
Professor Jason Leitch,
National Clinical Director

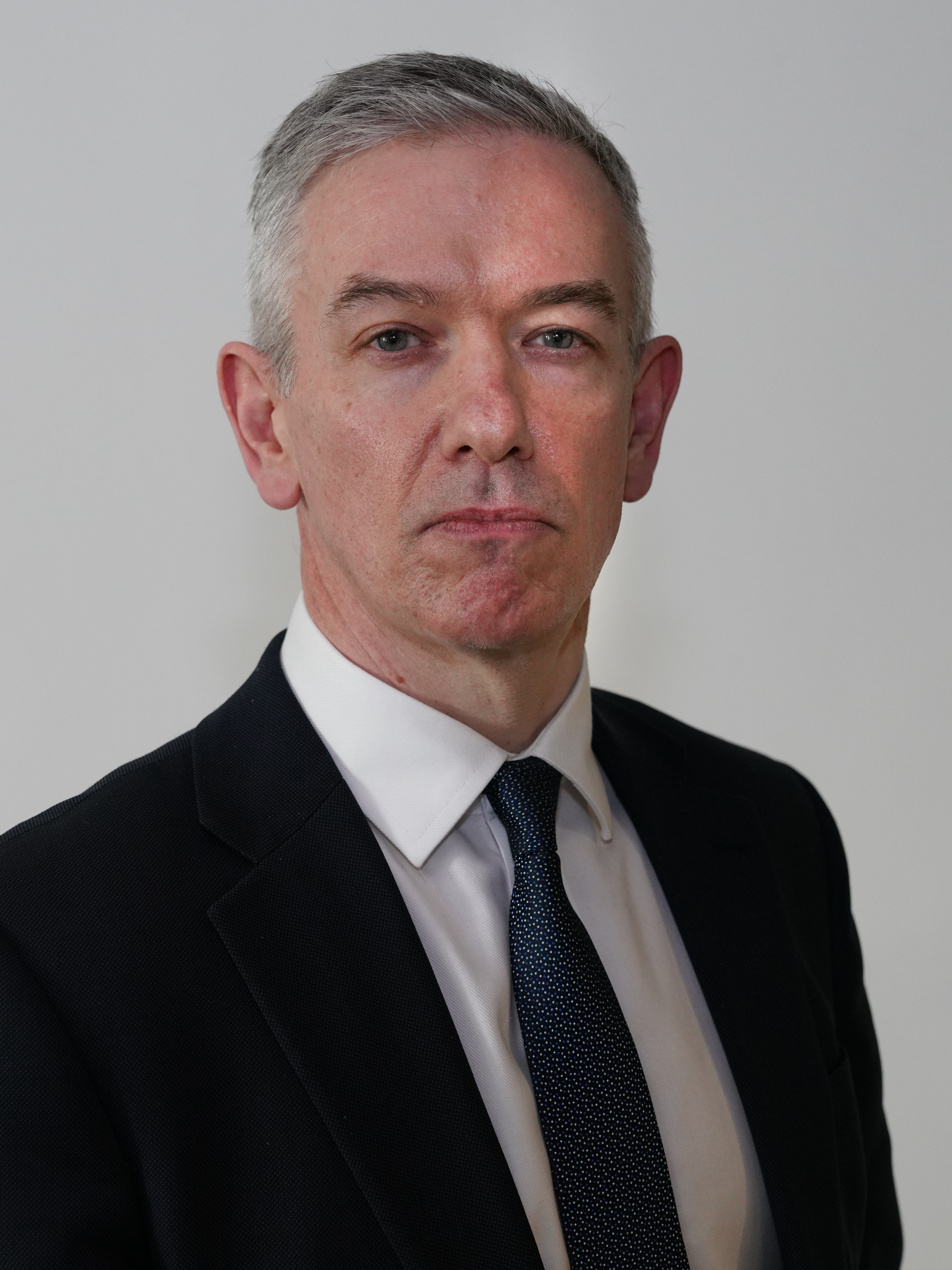
Dr. Gregor Smith,
Chief Medical Officer for Scotland

The main coordinating bodies responsible for Scotland's COVID-19 response were the Scottish Government Resilience Division and the COVID Health Response Directorate of the Health and Social Care Directorates. On 25 March 2020, the Scottish Government set up an expert advisory group to help develop and improve its COVID-19 response plan.

Dr Catherine Calderwood was Chief Medical Officer until her resignation from the post on 5 April 2020. Nicola Sturgeon accepted her resignation and replaced Calderwood on an acting basis with the Deputy Chief Medical Officer, Dr Gregor Smith. Jeane Freeman served as Health Secretary until she stepped down in May 2021. On 26 May 2021, the Key Scottish Government officials in Scotland leading the response to the outbreak were:

- First Minister of Scotland: Nicola Sturgeon
- Cabinet Secretary for Health and Social Care: Humza Yousaf
- Minister for Public Health, Women's Health and Sport: Maree Todd
- Chief Medical Officer for Scotland: Dr. Gregor Smith
- Chief Scientist Office: Professor David Crossman
- Chief Nursing Officer: Professor Amanda Croft
- National Clinical Director: Professor Jason Leitch
- Chief Economist: Gary Gillespie

=== Containment measures ===
Workplace hygiene advice was published on 9 March 2020 which included routine deep cleaning in regularly used touch points such as phones, card machines or door handles. Later, the First Minister Nicola Sturgeon announced a ban on mass gatherings (500 or more) on 12 March, with the ban starting on 16 March. A number of schools were closed due to reported symptoms, and underwent deep cleaning. On 18 March, it was announced that schools in Scotland would be closed starting on 20 March.

Unlike the rest of the UK, Scotland pursued a Zero-COVID strategy after the first nationwide lockdown was lifted.

=== Public Health Scotland ===
On 1 April 2020, the Scottish Government launched the new Public Health Scotland (PHS) agency, as a result of a three-way merger between NHS Health Scotland and the Information Services Division (ISD) and Health Protection Scotland (HPS) sections of Public Health and Intelligence (PHI) (which was in itself a strategic business unit of NHS National Services Scotland (NSS)). According to a 6 May 2020 report by the Press and Journal, PHS employed 1,100 staff and had a budget this year of £71 million, being jointly accountable to the Scottish Government and the Convention of Scottish Local Authorities (Cosla).

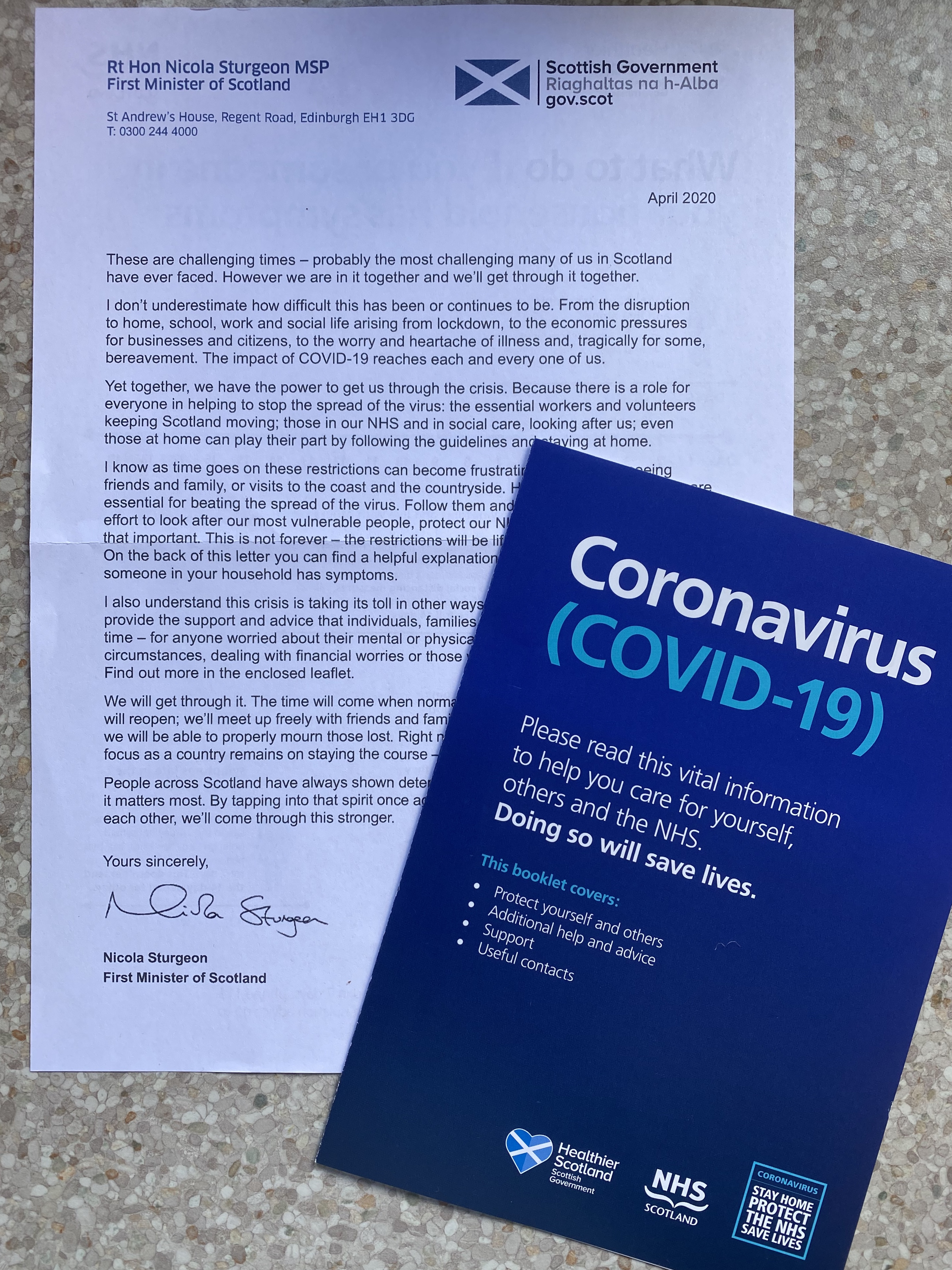
Mailed information about COVID-19, from First Minister

=== 'Scotland Cares' campaign ===
The 'Scotland Cares' campaign was launched on 30 March 2020 to encourage people to volunteer during the COVID-19 pandemic. More than 21,000 people signed up on the first day. By 4 April, the number of registrations to volunteer stood at 50,330. Cabinet Secretary for Social Security and Older People Shirley-Anne Somerville said, "The response to the Scotland Cares campaign has been outstanding and I want to thank each and every person who has signed up to volunteer during the COVID-19 outbreak. Your support at this critical time is invaluable and will make a huge difference over the coming weeks and months." Healthy volunteers were encouraged via the Ready Scotland website.

=== Vulnerable groups ===
From 3 April 2020, those in vulnerable groups were able to register for deliveries of food and medicine. This included around 120,000 Scots who had been advised to shield at home (12 weeks of self-isolation), those with suppressed or compromised immune systems, and those with underlying health conditions. The Scottish Government mailed out guidance regarding self-isolation if symptoms developed in a household member and about protective measures during the pandemic.

=== Levels System ===
==== October 2020 ====
From 23 October, the Scottish Government introduced a new 5-level System, similar to that in England. Levels ranged from 0 to 4 (inclusive). Social distancing measures applied in all levels, and some measures such as encouraging active transport, were present in all levels.

2020 Levels (these no longer apply)	Level 0 NEARLY NORMAL	Level 1 MEDIUM	Level 2 HIGH	Level 3 VERY HIGH	Level 4 LOCKDOWN
Socialising	Indoors 8 people from 3 households Outdoors 15 people from 5 households	Indoors 6 people from 2 households Outdoors 8 people from 3 households	No Socialising Indoors Outdoors 6 people from 2 Households	No Socialising Indoors Outdoors 6 people from 2 Households	No Socialising Indoors Outdoors 6 people from 2 Households (Excluding Hospitality Settings)
Hospitality	Licensing times apply	Last Entry at 21:30 with closing time an hour later.	Alcohol allowed with meal. Indoors Last Entry at 19:00 with closing time an hour later. Outdoors Last Entry at 21:30 with closing time an hour later.	Alcohol prohibited Last Entry at 17:00 with closing time an hour later.	Closed
Travel and Transport	Non-essential travel allowed (except travel to and from level 3 or 4 areas in Scotland, and to/from rest of UK.) Non-essential travel on public transport permitted	Non-essential travel allowed (except travel to and from level 3 or 4 areas in Scotland, and to/from rest of UK.) Non-essential travel on public transport permitted	Non-essential travel allowed (except travel to and from level 3 or 4 areas in Scotland, and to/from rest of UK.) Non-essential travel on public transport permitted	Essential travel only to and from level 3 or 4 areas in Scotland, and to/from rest of UK. No non-essential travel on public transport	Essential travel only to and from level 3 or 4 areas in Scotland, and to/from rest of UK. No non-essential travel on public transport
Places of Worship	Open. Max no: 50 people	Open. Max no: 50 people	Open. Max no: 50 people	Open. Max no: 50 people	Open. Max no: 20 people
Support Services	Open	Open	Open	Open, but online where possible	Open for essential support services, but online where possible
School and University	Open	Open	Open with some measures.	Open with enhanced measures. Restricted blending in Universities.	Open with enhanced measures. Restricted blending in Universities.
Shopping	Open	Open	Open	Open	Non-essential stores closed. Click and Collect services allowed
Close Contact Services	Open	Some measures apply	Some measures apply	Some measures apply	Closed
Childcare and Children's activities	Open with standard measures	Open with standard measures	Open with more measures	Open with enhanced measures	Early learning and childcare open with targeted intervention to impact capacity. Essential informal childcare only. Only outdoor unregulated children's activities
Visitor Attractions, Leisure & Entertainment facilities and public buildings	Open, excluding adult entertainment venues & nightclubs	Open, excluding adult entertainment venues & nightclubs	Visitor attractions open with additional measures. Cinemas, amusement arcades, bingo halls open. Soft play, funfairs, indoor bowling, theatres, snooker/ pool halls, music venues, casinos, nightclubs and adult entertainment closed Driving Lessons permitted	Visitor attractions open with additional measures. All leisure & entertainment venues including cinemas, amusement arcades and bingo halls closed. Driving Lessons permitted	Closed. Driving Lessons prohibited.
Events and Stadia	Outdoor events allowed Indoor seated/ambulatory events (including theatres) allowed with restricted numbers Stadium seated events allowed with restricted numbers Indoor grouped standing events prohibited	Outdoor seated events, and open space events allowed. Outdoor grouped events prohibited Indoor seated events allowed with further restricted numbers Stadium seated events allowed with further restricted numbers Indoor grouped standing events prohibited	Events generally not allowed. Stadia and theatres to close. Drive in events allowed	Events prohibited. Stadia closed	Events prohibited. Stadia closed
Public Services	Open	Open	Reduced face to face public services.	Reduced face to face public services.	Essential face to face public services only.
Sports	Open	Open, except for over 18 indoor contact sport	Open, except for over 18 indoor contact sport	Indoor individual exercise only (excluding under 18) Outdoor sport allowed except over 18 contact sport.	Indoor sport venues closed. Outdoor non-contact sports allowed
Work	Open, but remote work advised	Open, except for non-essential call centres. Remote work advised	Open, except for non-essential call centres. Remote work advised	Open, except for non-essential call centres. Enhanced measures in place Remote work advised	Remote work, excluding essential work, outdoor workplaces, manufacturing and construction
Events	Max of 50 people at Wedding/Civil Partnership Ceremonies Max of 50 people at Funerals Max of 50 people at post-funeral receptions/gatherings No Wedding/Civil Partnership reception allowed.	Max of 20 people at Wedding/Civil Partnership Ceremonies Max of 20 people at Funerals Max of 20 people at post-funeral receptions/gatherings No Wedding/Civil Partnership reception allowed.	Max of 20 people at Wedding/Civil Partnership Ceremonies Max of 20 people at Funerals Max of 20 people at post-funeral receptions/gatherings No Wedding/Civil Partnership reception allowed.	Max of 20 people at Wedding/Civil Partnership Ceremonies Max of 20 people at Funerals Max of 20 people at post-funeral receptions/gatherings No Wedding/Civil Partnership reception allowed.	Max of 20 people at Wedding/Civil Partnership Ceremonies Max of 20 people at Funerals Max of 20 people at post-funeral receptions No Wedding/Civil Partnership or Funeral reception allowed.
Accommodation	Open	Open	Open	Open with some restrictions. Work related use of accommodation allowed. Local non-essential use of accommodation allowed and encouraged.	Essential only. No tourism allowed

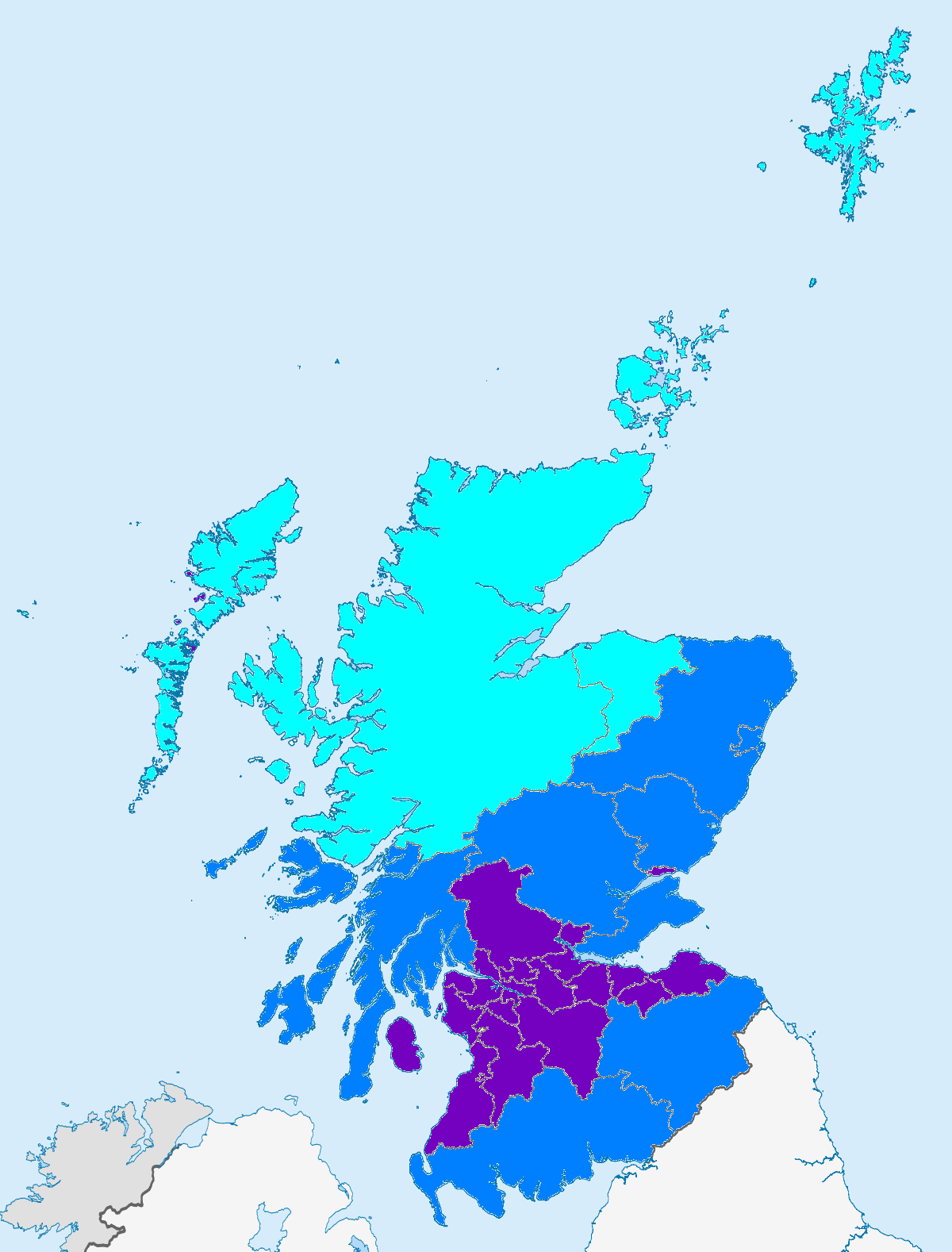
Tiers as of 10 October

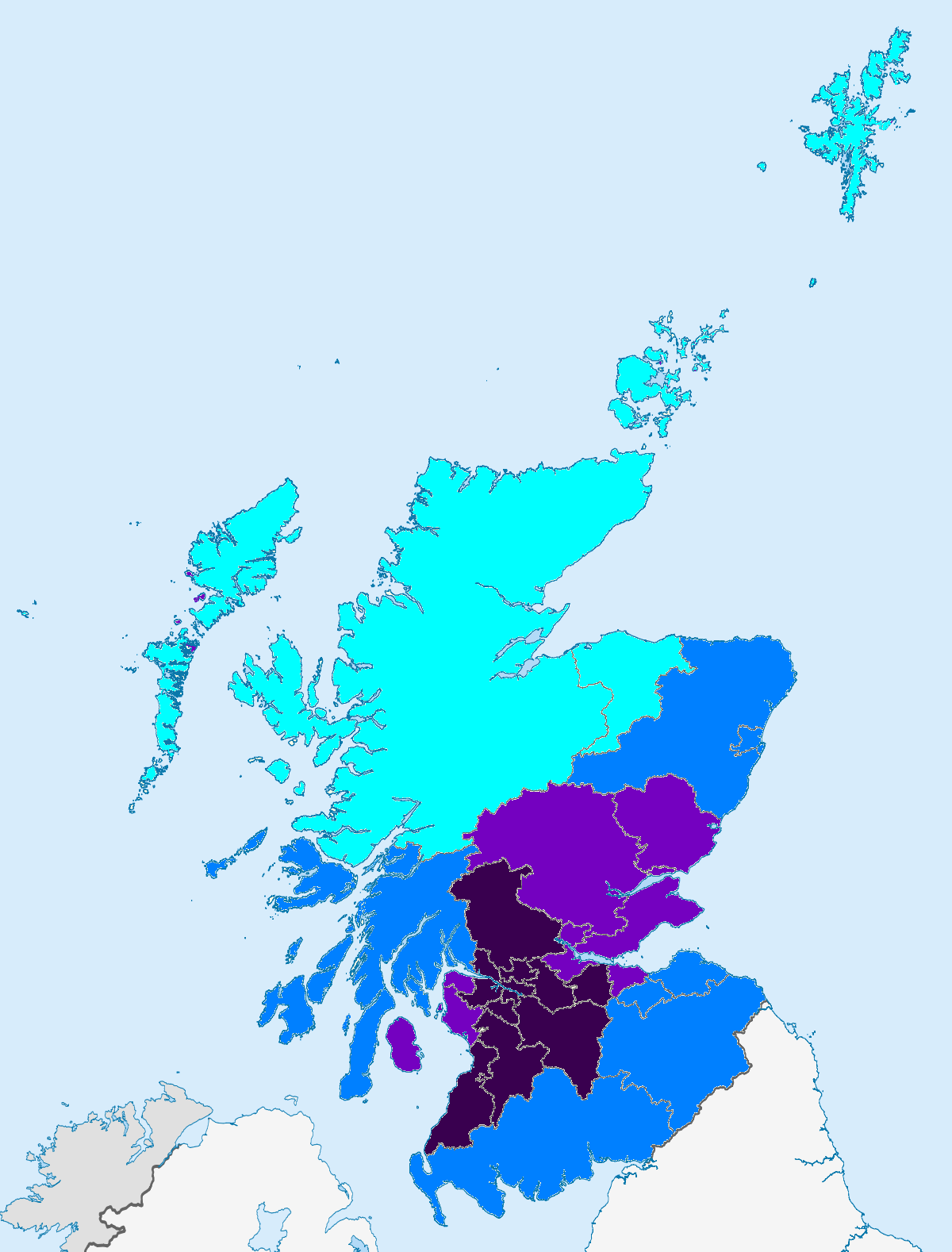
Tiers as of 17 November

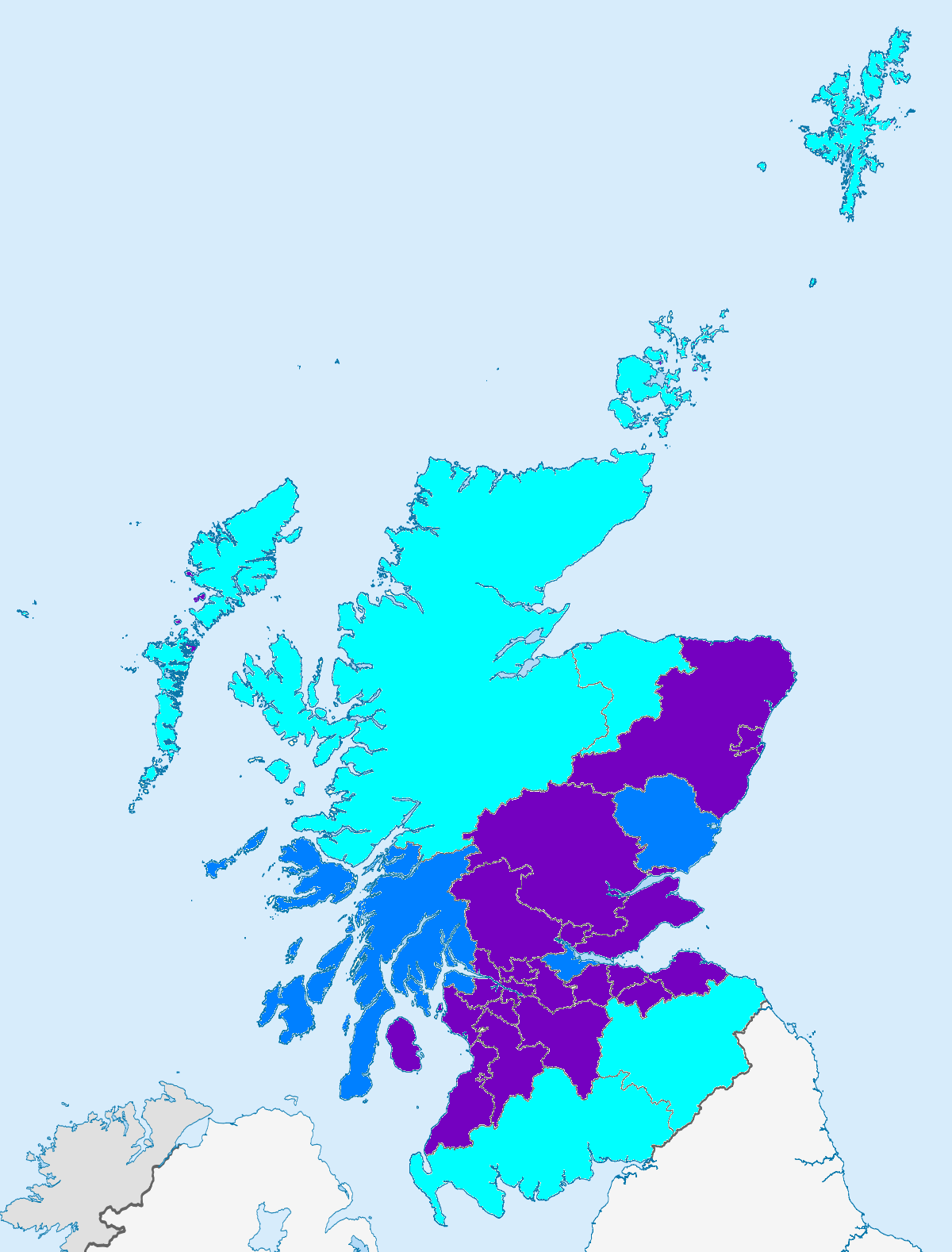
Tiers as of 15 December

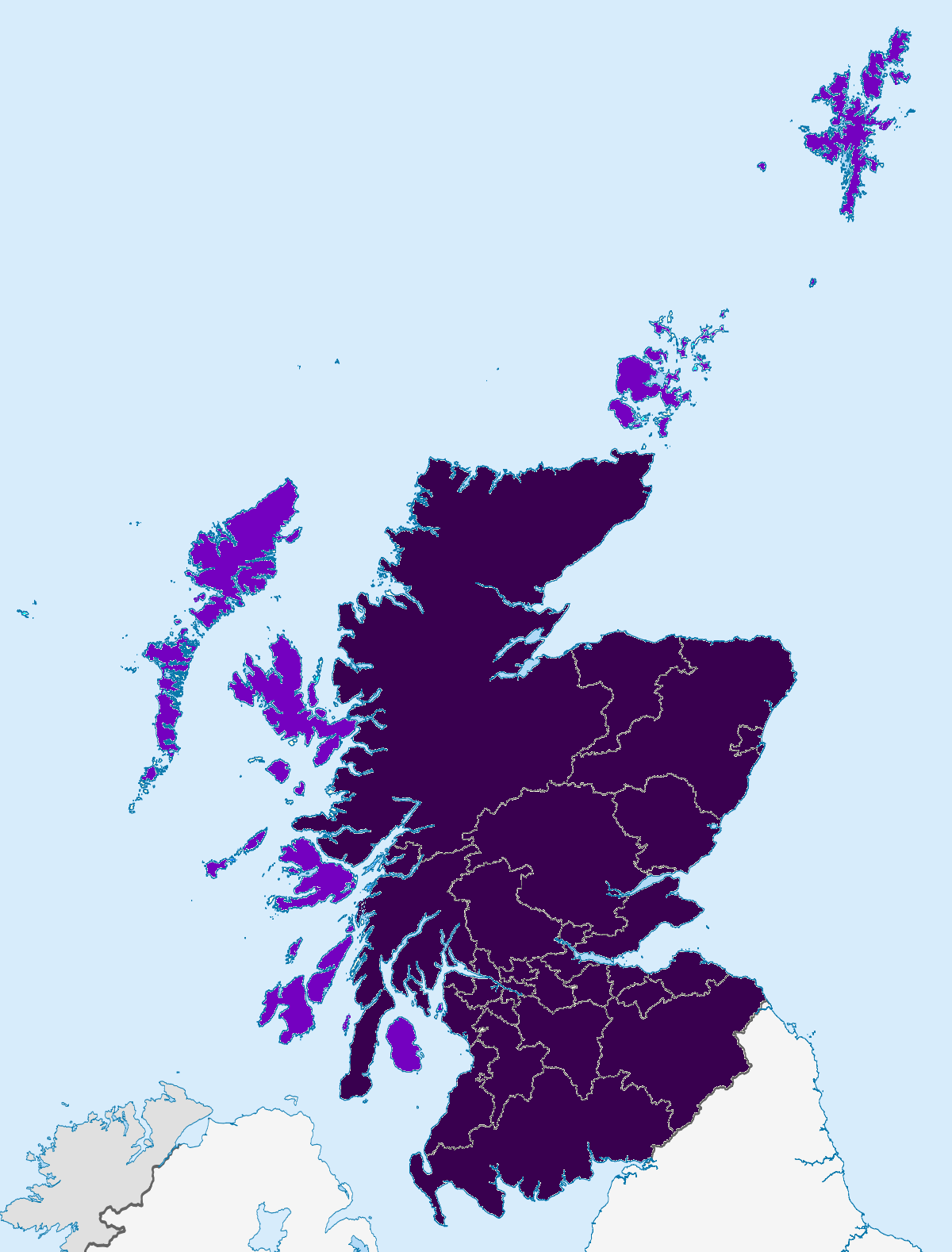
Tiers as of 26 December

==== February 2021 ====
Revised Levels were published in February 2021.

2021 Levels	Level 0	Level 1	Level 2	Level 3	Level 4
Summary	8 people from 4 households can meet in a private dwelling	6 people from 3 households can meet in a private dwelling	6 people from 3 households can meet in a private dwelling	6 people from 3 households can meet in a public indoor setting; restricted travel to/from a lower Level	4 people from 2 households can meet in a private garden or a public outdoor setting, restricted travel to/from a lower Level

== Testing and contact tracing ==
=== Testing capacity ===
NHS Scotland's testing capacity for COVID-19 increased from around 750 a day in early March 2020 to about 1,900 a day in early April.

By 15 March 2020, COVID-19 testing was extended into Scotland's communities but there would be no routine testing of people with minor symptoms.

NHS Scotland planned to reach a testing capacity of around 3,500 a day by the end of April 2020.

Glasgow University launched a major COVID-19 testing facility in mid-April 2020, staffed 24/7 by more than 500 volunteers including molecular scientists, technicians and bioinformaticians.

Aberdeen University provided three machines to NHS Grampian to speed up COVID-19 testing.

By 2 April 2020, around 3,500 tests had been conducted on NHS workers and family members in Scotland. It was also reported in that week that around 6% of Scotland's frontline NHS staff are not currently working, either because they have COVID-19 symptoms or live with someone who has. A COVID-19 testing facility for NHS staff was opened at Glasgow Airport car park on 5 April.

Chief Medical Officer for Scotland, Catherine Calderwood, described mass testing as a distraction that will not slow down the spread of the virus. She said: "I have been saying and advising the First Minister and the Cabinet Secretary for several weeks now about the distraction that I think the focus on testing may become. The testing is extremely useful but it is only going to be positive within a short window of perhaps 48 to 72 hours while somebody has symptoms, because there needs to be an amount of virus in that person to be able for that to be detected. But the thought that the testing in some way slows the virus or is a part of our strategy to prevent transmission is a fallacy, I'm afraid. The testing gives us more information but the social distancing and all of these stringent measures are what we actually need to prevent spread and prevent serious illnesses and death."

Cam Donaldson, a health economist and Pro Vice Chancellor Research at Glasgow Caledonian University, wrote of his scepticism of a "mass testing" strategy.

Derek Gatherer, a leading Scottish virologist, warned that plans to test, trace and isolate everyone infected with the COVID-19 after lockdown would not slow its spread.

Experts who advocated for a mass or large scale testing approach include Harry Burns, former Scotland Chief Medical Officer, and Allan Wilson, President of the Institute of Biomedical Science

Professor Hugh Pennington, a leading bacteriologist, said that laboratory testing could have been easily scaled up ten-fold, and criticised former chief medical officer Catherine Calderwood for dismissing testing as a 'distraction'. Pennington believed that a failure to increase testing to adequate levels would prove to be an enormous embarrassment to the UK and Scottish governments. He said: "You test, so you can trace then take appropriate action, it's basic shoe leather epidemiology," adding he would not be surprised if the lack of testing had cost lives, particularly in care homes. "We know [care homes] are hotbeds of infection, vulnerable in annual flu outbreaks and that you have to look after them by stopping the virus getting in. Much of that comes back to testing, tracing and isolating."

Former Scottish health secretary Alex Neil agreed, "the countries that have done this since day one are those with the lowest death and infection rates and mass testing allows you to identify a second wave of infection if it appears."

Professor of Immunology, Denis Kinane, said Scotland would need to conduct at least 15,000 tests a day to get on top of the disease.

Research carried out by a scientific online publication, Our World In Data, on COVID-19 test rates across EU member states ranked Scotland at 19 out of 25 countries that publish such data.

As of 11 May 2020, a total of 74,063 people in Scotland had been tested for COVID-19 in NHS labs. Of these, 13,627 tests were confirmed positive, 60,436 tests were confirmed negative and 1,862 patients who tested positive died. A total of 101,122 COVID-19 tests had been carried out by NHS Scotland labs in hospitals, care homes or the community. In addition, there were a total of 27,647 drive through and mobile tests carried out by Regional Testing Centres in Scotland.

In November 2020, two further 'mega labs' were announced as due to open early in 2021, one of which was to be at 'an unconfirmed site in Scotland'. The Scottish 'mega lab' was subject to delays and in January 2021, its construction was halted. The UK government was reported to be assessing "the long-term demand" for the laboratory. Meanwhile, new regional COVID-19 laboratories were opened in Glasgow and Aberdeen during December 2020, but another planned for Edinburgh had not yet opened.

=== Contact tracing system ===
Ciaran Jenkins of Channel 4 News contrasted the differing approaches on contact-tracing strategy between the Republic of Ireland and the health authorities in the UK including Scotland's.

Public health expert Prof Allyson Pollock has argued that a bespoke test-trace-isolate approach could work well in Scottish island communities.

== Public healthcare infrastructure ==
=== Primary care network ===
Health Secretary Jeane Freeman said in a statement in the Scottish Parliament a network of COVID-19 local assessment centres was to be set up across Scotland with 50 planned in the first wave. A network of "humanitarian assistance centres" was also to be set up, working with GPs and other local partners to arrange delivery of medicine, care services and grocery delivery.

=== Hospital capacity ===
Scotland had an estimated 3,000 hospital beds expected to be available for COVID-19 patients in hospitals across Scotland.

ICU capacity across Scotland rose sharply shortly after the pandemic began, doubling to a total of 360 beds by the end of March 2020, 250 of which were for the exclusive use of COVID-19 patients. That number was expected to increase to more than 500 in the first week of April as preparations continued towards eventually quadrupling the number to more than 700 ICU beds.

The NHS Louisa Jordan emergency COVID-19 hospital facility at the SEC Centre was due to initially have capacity for 300 patients, expected to expand to more than 1,000.

Scottish hospitals planned to have around 1,000 ventilators by the summer of 2020 for COVID-19 patients.

By 1 April 2020, NHS clinical and technical staff had converted over 200 anaesthetic machines into ventilators to increase ICU bed availability to more than 500, tripling the usual capacity.

By 24 March more than 3,000 retired Scottish nurses, doctors and other medical workers had volunteered to return to work as part of efforts to help the NHS cope. As well as using retired workers, all final year nursing and midwifery students were also to be given paid work placements on wards during the final six months of their degree programmes.

On 30 March, then First Minister Nicola Sturgeon announced the suspension of several non-COVID-19 screens (such as diabetic eye screening) to help free up NHS staff and reduce the risk of virus exposure to patients. All elective and non-urgent surgeries had already been cancelled across Scotland to free up hospital beds.

On 27 April 2020, 121 junior doctors had started their careers early to support NHS Greater Glasgow and Clyde Scotland's largest health board in its COVID-19 response. A new post, foundation intermediate year, was created to allow them to start four months earlier than scheduled. They would be placed at Glasgow Royal Infirmary; Queen Elizabeth University Hospital; Royal Alexandra Hospital, Paisley; and Inverclyde Royal Hospital, Greenock.

As of 11 May 2020, 3,114 inpatients had been discharged from Scottish hospitals since 5 March 2020, who had also been tested positive for COVID-19. 632 people were in delayed discharge in Scottish hospitals. This was 980 less than the baseline period (04/03 weekly return). A total of 6,227 staff (or around 3.8%) from the NHS Scotland workforce, were reporting absent due to a range of COVID-19 related reasons.

=== Hospital-acquired infection ===
On the issue of hospital-acquired infections, Michael Griffin, president of the Royal College of Surgeons of Edinburgh warned that COVID-19 may be spreading in hospitals at twice the rate of its transmission in communities. He said "we have to make our hospital environment as safe as possible. In the general population, the rate of reproduction of COVID-19 is less than one but in hospitals it is estimated at something like two."

=== A&E departments ===
The number of people attending Accident and Emergency departments in Scotland had fallen by more than 55% in 2020, compared with 2019. NHS Scotland statistics reveal 11,881 people attended A&E in the second week of April 2020, down from 26,674 patients in 2019 and 25,067 in 2018.

=== NHS staffing levels ===
As of 2 April, more than 14% of NHS Scotland staff were off work, according to Scottish government data, and about 41% of those absences (equating to 9,719 people) were related to COVID-19. NHS Scotland's total workforce was around 166,000 people at the time.

== Personal protective equipment ==
On 2 April, new guidance on appropriate personal protective equipment (PPE) for healthcare hospital, general practice, ambulance and social care workers responding to COVID-19 has been issued by officials.

On 26 April 2020, in response to a Sunday Times story that claimed the Scottish government failed to accept offers from six Scottish firms offering to supply PPE, a spokeswoman for the Scottish government said it had received 1,600 offers of help from Scottish businesses and individuals to supply or manufacture PPE and that a dedicated team and mailbox had been set up to focus on offers from local and global suppliers. The spokeswoman added: "We understand that potential suppliers will desire prompt decisions but our priority focus is to quickly identify those offers that can supply the largest volumes at the correct quality specifications and timescales necessary to meet the requirements of frontline services".

Health secretary Jeane Freeman announced that PPE would be available to social care providers through a national network of hubs from 27 April 2020.

Also in April 2020 whistle-blowers in the NHS came forward to reveal that staff were being made to reuse dirty personal protective equipment (PPE) while at work. One nurse told STV, "[When we hear the government say supplies are fine] it's not frustrating, it's crushing. It is absolutely crushing. We feel we are being lied to." Sturgeon told the Scottish Parliament in July, "At no point within this crisis has Scotland run out of any aspect of PPE. We have worked hard to make sure that supplies are there, we've worked hard overcoming challenges that we have faced along the way."

A fundraising drive to buy PPE for frontline workers under the name of 'Masks for Scotland' was spearheaded by Dundee University Professor of vascular medicine Jill Belch.

== Clinical research ==
Organisations in Scotland involved in COVID-19 related clinical research studies include the Chief Scientist Office's Rapid Research in COVID-19 programme (RARC-19 programme), Health Science Scotland, NHS Research Scotland, Glasgow University, Dundee University, and Edinburgh University.

Chief medical officer Dr Gregor Smith said in April 2020 nearly 800 patients have so far taken part in at least 10 clinical studies to develop COVID-19 treatments, with another four being set up in hospitals, intensive care units and primary care facilities. One study is looking at whether existing HIV drugs including Lopinavir and Ritonavir could be used with results available in three months. Another study led by Dr Kenneth Baillie of Edinburgh University looks at the genetics of patients susceptible to severe illness by comparing patients' DNA with that of healthy people who show no or mild symptoms.

Dundee University lead a trial into brensocatib (formerly known as INS1007), a drug for lung inflammation (acute respiratory distress syndrome), aiming to treat the worst symptoms of COVID-19 and prevent the need for ventilation. Up to 20% of COVID-19 patients develop lung inflammation, which can require them to be ventilated. The inflammatory response to the virus causes lung damage that can lead to respiratory failure and death in severe cases. It was hoped the treatment would also lead to patients spending fewer days dependent on oxygen and shorter periods of time in hospital, reducing the burden on healthcare systems. Funding and drug supply for the STOP-COVID19 (Superiority Trial of Protease Inhibition in COVID-19) trial was provided by biopharmaceutical company Insmed Incorporated. The trial began in May 2020 and researchers planned to recruit 300 volunteers from 10 hospitals. The project was led by James Chalmers, professor of respiratory research at Dundee University and consultant respiratory physician at Ninewells Hospital, one of the trial sites. NHS Tayside research and development director Professor Jacob George was the study investigator. However, 28 days of the drug worsened clinical status and led to more deaths.

Research led by Edinburgh University in collaboration with Imperial College London and University College London identified that COVID-19 vaccination did not lead to either an increase in miscarriages or reduction in live births.

== Impacts ==
=== Health ===
==== Care homes ====
It was reported on 17 April 2020 that extra supplies of personal protective equipment (PPE) would be delivered directly to more than 1,000 care homes in Scotland.

Before the pandemic the care sector usually sourced its own PPE, but as extreme pressure was put on supply chains concerns grew that PPE manufacturers did not have capacity to deliver to Scotland in adequate quantities.

The Scottish government announced on 17/18 April that the NHS National Services Scotland would prioritise the delivery of stock directly to care homes where the virus is known to be present, although stock would still be provided to local hubs which supply PPE to other social care workers.

During the early stages of the pandemic 1,300 elderly hospital patients were transferred into care homes without receiving a negative COVID-19 test result. Many had been infected with the virus and ended up passing it on to other care home residents. Over three thousand care home residents died from COVID-19 and Gary Smith, Scotland Secretary of the GMB, said the policy had turned "care homes into morgues". When asked by the BBC if the policy had been a mistake, Sturgeon said: "Looking back on that now, with the knowledge we have now and with the benefit of hindsight, yes."

Two of the worst suspected outbreaks in care homes occurred at Elderslie care home in Paisley, Renfrewshire and at Berelands House Care in Prestwick, Ayrshire.

Thirteen residents at the Glasgow-based Burlington Care Home died in one week following a suspected outbreak of COVID-19. The Care Inspectorate has been made aware of the deaths and are in contact with the care service, as well as the local health and social care partnership.

As of 10 May 2020, 474 (44% of all) adult care homes had a current suspected COVID-19 case. This is a care home where at least one care home resident has exhibited symptoms during the last 14 days. 609 (or 56% of all) adult care homes in Scotland had reported at least one notification for suspected COVID-19 to the Care Inspectorate. 434 of these care homes have reported more than one case of suspected COVID-19. There have been 4,503 cumulative cases of suspected COVID-19 in care homes. This is an increase of 58 suspected cases on the previous day. 3,672 staff were reported as absent in adult care homes due to COVID-19, based on returns received from 822 (76%) adult care homes as of 5 May. This represents 8.5% of all adult care home staff (43,403) for whom a return was provided.

==== Effect of Lockdown on NHS services ====
An assessment of the immediate impact of the COVID-19 pandemic on motor neuron disease services and mortality in Scotland has shown that there has been no early increase in mortality but that there is a need for vigilance as key services were shown to be impacted upon.

==== Medicolegal impact of COVID-19 on healthcare professionals ====
The COVID-19 pandemic has shone a spotlight on pre-existing issues in the legal framework in the UK that surround healthcare professionals and patients, encouraging action to be taken now. During the COVID-19 pandemic, many doctors and other healthcare professionals have worked in unfamiliar surroundings and been assigned to new clinical areas, while balancing an unprecedented workload and addressing an overall lack of knowledge about the virus itself. This has led to concerns that there may be an increase in complaints about treatment provided in these circumstances, and competing arguments on how these should be handled within the criminal, civil and regulatory system.

=== Education ===
As of 19 March 2020, the Robert Gordon University, Edinburgh Napier University, the University of Dundee, the University of Glasgow, University of the West of Scotland, Glasgow Caledonian University, the University of Aberdeen, Edinburgh University, Heriot-Watt University, University of Stirling and University of Strathclyde had cancelled or suspended face-to-face classes. Scottish political parties (Green, Conservatives, SNP) also cancelled their spring conferences.

=== Events ===
In early March 2020, with Rangers vs Leverkusen being the last game played in Scotland on 12 March, football matches in the Scottish Professional Football League were cancelled until further notice, alongside a Six Nations game between Wales and Scotland. Radio 1's Big Weekend, which was due to take place in Dundee in May 2020 was cancelled in response to the outbreak.

On 7 May, The Royal National Mòd Inverness, scheduled for October was postponed to 2021. The next three Mods were also to the subsequent year.

=== Police, court and prison systems ===
Scottish Police Federation (SPF) said new PPE for officers would not provide any "meaningful protection", after Police Scotland announced staff would be given surgical face masks to wear when adhering to social distancing measures was not possible. But the SPF said that its new expert pandemic response panel refused to endorse the type two masks.

From 27 March to 24 April 2020, police officers have made 78 arrests and issued 1,637 fixed penalty notices in Scotland related to lockdown violations.

On 2 April 2020, BBC Scotland said it found almost a quarter of Scottish Prison Service staff are absent from work amid the COVID-19 outbreak. The SPS said 110 prisoners over 11 sites were self-isolating. At that time, two had tested positive for COVID-19.

The first recorded COVID-19-related death of a Scottish prison officer was announced on 22 April. SPS spokesman Tom Fox confirmed where appropriate all prison officers are provided with PPE. It is not believed that the officer caught the virus while at work.

As of 23 April 2020, 94 people in custody across nine sites were self-isolating, 12 people had tested positive and staff absences were at 19.7% of the workforce.

The Scottish Courts and Tribunal Service consolidated its work into 10 hub sheriff courts with as much work as possible done remotely.

Up to 450 prisoners were released early in May and June 2020 to free up space for solitary rooms to reduce the spread of the virus. Only those sentenced to 18 months or less of imprisonment and who have 90 days or less of their sentence were eligible for early release. People convicted of COVID-19 related offenses and those who had recently been convicted of domestic abuse were not eligible for early release, and each prison governor was given the power to veto the release of any prisoner deemed unsafe to anyone else.

Deputy chief constable Will Kerr said in April 2020 the number of people in police custody has been significantly down during the pandemic and said changes during the lockdown such as virtual courts and digital evidence have helped minimise contact and time spent in custody and could be retained once the pandemic is over.

=== Economy ===
==== GDP ====
The Scottish Government's Chief Economist Gary Gillespie said on 21 April 2020 Scotland's GDP could fall by as much as 33% from the lockdown crisis.

==== Social Security ====
During March and early April 2020, there were around 110,000 Universal Credit claims in Scotland, up from an average of 20,000 a month in 2019.

Citizens Advice Scotland provides help to those who experience difficulties navigating the complex welfare system.

==== Transport Industry ====
Glasgow Taxi Owners' Association urged taxi drivers to be careful during the ongoing COVID-19 pandemic, after hearing reports of drivers falling ill. Chief Nursing Officer Fiona McQueen said good hand hygiene is vital along with physical distancing and wearing face coverings when in enclosed spaces such as shops and public transport.

==== Retail Industry ====
Retail sales in Scotland for March 2020 declined 13% in comparison to March 2019 Scottish Retail Consortium-KPMG Scottish Retail Monitor. Pre-lockdown the monitor recorded a 9% growth in the first three weeks of March but this was followed by a 44% decline in the last two weeks of that period. Total food sales were up 12.1% against the previous year while total non-food sales were down 33.6%. Adjusted for the estimated effect of online sales, total non-food sales decreased by 27.9%.

==== Construction Industry ====
Royal Institution of Chartered Surveyors (RICS) said its headline statistic for workloads in Scotland fell into negative territory for the first time in four years, dropping by 4% in the first three months of 2020. Its quarterly survey of members found confidence fell sharply when the lockdown measures were introduced.

In Scotland, work was ordered to be suspended on all non-essential construction projects from 6 April. By 17 April 79% of all housebuilding schemes had been suspended (according to a Glenigan survey of projects with a construction value of more than £250,000).

== Statistics ==
=== Total cases and deaths ===
Total number of laboratory confirmed cases and deaths recorded 28 days after a positive lab test result.

=== New cases ===
Number of people who have had a lab-confirmed positive test result.

==== New cases per day ====
2020

2021

=== Number of deaths ===
Number of people who die within 28 days of a positive lab test result.

==== New deaths per day ====
2020

2021

== See also ==
- COVID-19 pandemic by country
- COVID-19 pandemic in Europe
- COVID-19 pandemic in the United Kingdom
- COVID-19 pandemic in England
- COVID-19 pandemic in London
- COVID-19 pandemic in Northern Ireland
- COVID-19 pandemic in Wales
