= DPP1 =

DPP1 may refer to one of two enzymes:

- Cathepsin C
- Diacylglycerol diphosphate phosphatase
