= PAP2 =

PAP2 may refer to:

- Diacylglycerol diphosphate phosphatase, an enzyme
- Linksys, a brand of networking products
