= Dipeptidyl-peptidase I =

Dipeptidyl peptidase I
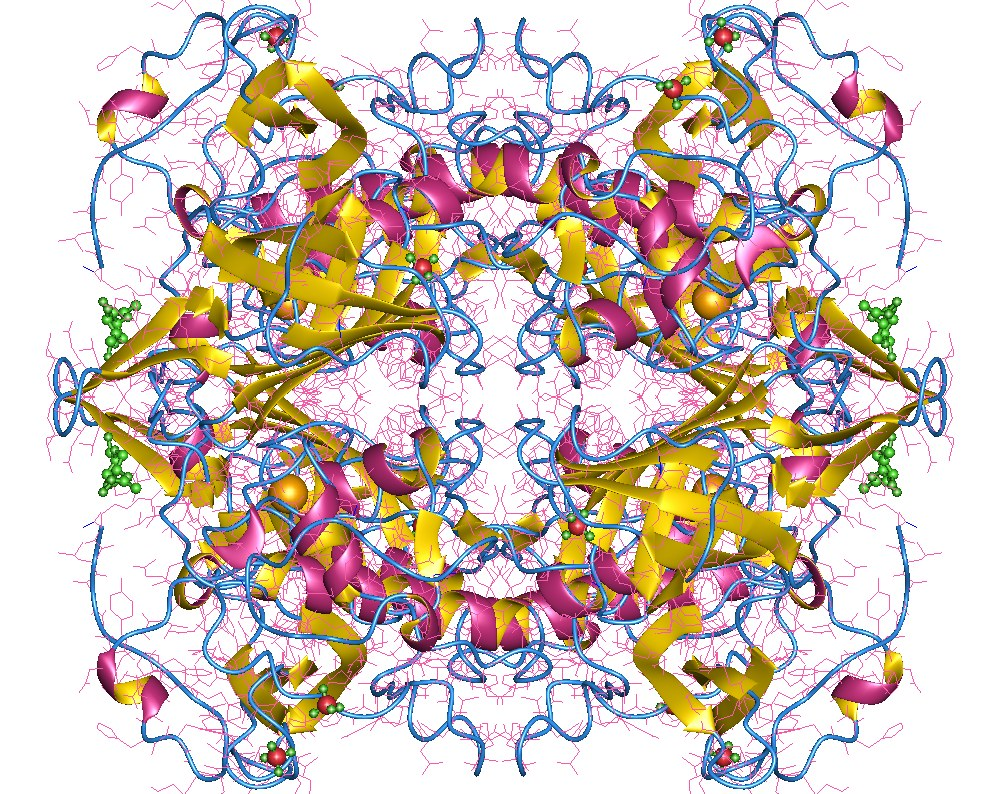
- Cathepsin C, heterododekamer, Human

Identifiers
- EC no.: 3.4.14.1
- CAS no.: 9032-68-2

Databases
- IntEnz: IntEnz view
- BRENDA: BRENDA entry
- ExPASy: NiceZyme view
- KEGG: KEGG entry
- MetaCyc: metabolic pathway
- PRIAM: profile
- PDB structures: RCSB PDB PDBe PDBsum
Search
- PMC: articles
- PubMed: articles
- NCBI: proteins

Dipeptidyl peptidase I (EC 3.4.14.1) is an enzyme which in humans is encoded by the CTSC gene, and often called cathepsin C. This enzyme catalyses the following chemical reaction

Release of an N-terminal dipeptide, Xaa-Yaa!Zaa-, except when Xaa is Arg or Lys, or Yaa or Zaa is Pro

This Cl-dependent, lysosomal cysteine-type peptidase is maximally active at acidic pH.
