= Jacob George =

Malaysian-British professor

Jacob George (born 1974/75) is a Malaysian-British professor of cardiovascular medicine at Ninewells Hospital and the University of Dundee School of Medicine in Scotland. He became Chief Medical and Scientific Officer of the MHRA in 2026.

== Career ==
George is Chair of Cardiovascular Medicine and Therapeutics, Cardiology at the University of Dundee.

He attended the University of Sheffield and the University of Dundee.

In 2017, George became an adviser to the Malaysian Scientific Review Panel for Phase I Clinical Trials.

In 2025, he became an Honorary Professor at Dnipro State Medical University in Ukraine for delivering online lectures to students and faculty since the Russian invasion in 2022, which was recognised in the Scottish Parliament by Michael Marra MSP.

His appointment as the first Chief Medical and Scientific Officer for the UK Medicines and Healthcare products Regulatory Agency (MHRA) began in January 2026. In March 2026, he voluntarily recused himself from overseeing the Pathways trial of puberty blockers for teenagers with gender dysphoria after pausing the trial in February, following reports he previously expressed gender critical views on social media in order to avoid any perception of impartiality.

He is a Fellow of the British Hypertension Society, the European Society of Cardiology, and the Royal College of Physicians, Edinburgh. He is also chair of a board advising the Scottish government on new medicines, co-chair of an NIHR funding committee, and clinical lead for a Scottish national medicines group.

== Research ==
In 2013, his observational research with Li Wei and colleagues at UCL published in the BMJ on salt levels in soluble and effervescent medicines showed an increased risk of cardiovascular events and a 28% higher death rate due to high sodium intake from drugs. In 2015, the European Medicines Agency recommended changes to drug labelling in response to the study, to give the sodium level and show high sodium.

The VESUVIUS randomized controlled trial published in 2019 by George and colleagues in Journal of the American College of Cardiology and funded by the British Heart Foundation found that smokers who switched to vaping had improved cardiovascular function. George said, "They're not quite normal, but their vascular function improved quite significantly, just within a month." In 2023, he began a further study on passive vaping.

In 2020, with James Chalmers he ran a trial of brensocatib for COVID-19 treatment. 28 days of the drug worsened clinical status and led to more deaths. Later that year, he also ran a trial of the Janssen COVID-19 vaccine.

He is working with Dundee spin-out company PhaSER Biomedical on an AI predictor of side effects due to drug interactions.

== Personal life ==
George was born in Kuala Lumpur, Malaysia, grew up in Bukit Raja, and attended the Anglo Chinese School, Klang. His father worked for Sime Darby and his mother was a physiotherapist at Universiti Malaya Medical Centre; his family is Malayali, originally from Kerala, India. He moved to the UK in 1995. His wife was born in Kottayam, Kerala, where they were married in 2005.
