= Florensocatib =

Investigational drug

Clinical data
- Other names: CHF-10196; HSK-31858

Identifiers
- IUPAC name: (2S)-N-[(1S)-1-cyano-2-[2-fluoro-4-(3-methyl-2-oxo-1,3-benzoxazol-5-yl)phenyl]ethyl]-1,4-oxazepane-2-carboxamide
- CAS Number: 2762114-61-2
- PubChem CID: 162738687
- ChemSpider: 129703697
- UNII: RWC743JRK7

Chemical and physical data
- Formula: C_{23}H_{23}FN_{4}O_{4}
- Molar mass: 438.459 g·mol^{−1}
- 3D model (JSmol): Interactive image
- SMILES: CN1C2=C(C=CC(=C2)C3=CC(=C(C=C3)C[C@@H](C#N)NC(=O)[C@@H]4CNCCCO4)F)OC1=O
- InChI: InChI=InChI=1S/C23H23FN4O4/c1-28-19-11-15(5-6-20(19)32-23(28)30)14-3-4-16(18(24)10-14)9-17(12-25)27-22(29)21-13-26-7-2-8-31-21/h3-6,10-11,17,21,26H,2,7-9,13H2,1H3,(H,27,29)/t17-,21-/m0/s1; Key:ONJDRXNRBKHINH-UWJYYQICSA-N

Florensocatib is an investigational new drug that is being developed by Chiesi Farmaceutici S.p.A. for the treatment of bronchiectasis. It is a cathepsin C inhibitor.
