= Verducatib =

Investigational drug

Clinical data
- Other names: BI-1291583

Identifiers
- IUPAC name: (1R,3S,4S)-N-[(1S)-1-cyano-2-[2-fluoro-4-[1'-(oxetan-3-yl)spiro[1H-2-benzofuran-3,4'-piperidine]-5-yl]phenyl]ethyl]-2-azabicyclo[2.2.1]heptane-3-carboxamide
- CAS Number: 1887236-33-0
- PubChem CID: 118939917
- ChemSpider: 129001882
- UNII: LPO8EV0QNS
- ChEMBL: ChEMBL5942494

Chemical and physical data
- Formula: C_{31}H_{35}FN_{4}O_{3}
- Molar mass: 530.644 g·mol^{−1}
- 3D model (JSmol): Interactive image
- SMILES: C1C[C@@H]2C[C@H]1[C@H](N2)C(=O)N[C@@H](CC3=C(C=C(C=C3)C4=CC5=C(COC56CCN(CC6)C7COC7)C=C4)F)C#N
- InChI: InChI=InChI=1S/C31H35FN4O3/c32-28-14-20(1-3-21(28)11-25(15-33)35-30(37)29-22-5-6-24(12-22)34-29)19-2-4-23-16-39-31(27(23)13-19)7-9-36(10-8-31)26-17-38-18-26/h1-4,13-14,22,24-26,29,34H,5-12,16-18H2,(H,35,37)/t22-,24+,25-,29-/m0/s1; Key:MIBKKDLVBYJWTB-AIKBEYBBSA-N

Verducatib is an investigational new drug that is being evaluated by Boehringer Ingelheim for the treatment of bronchiectasis. It is a cathepsin C inhibitor.
