= Run for Heroes =

UK non-profit organisation

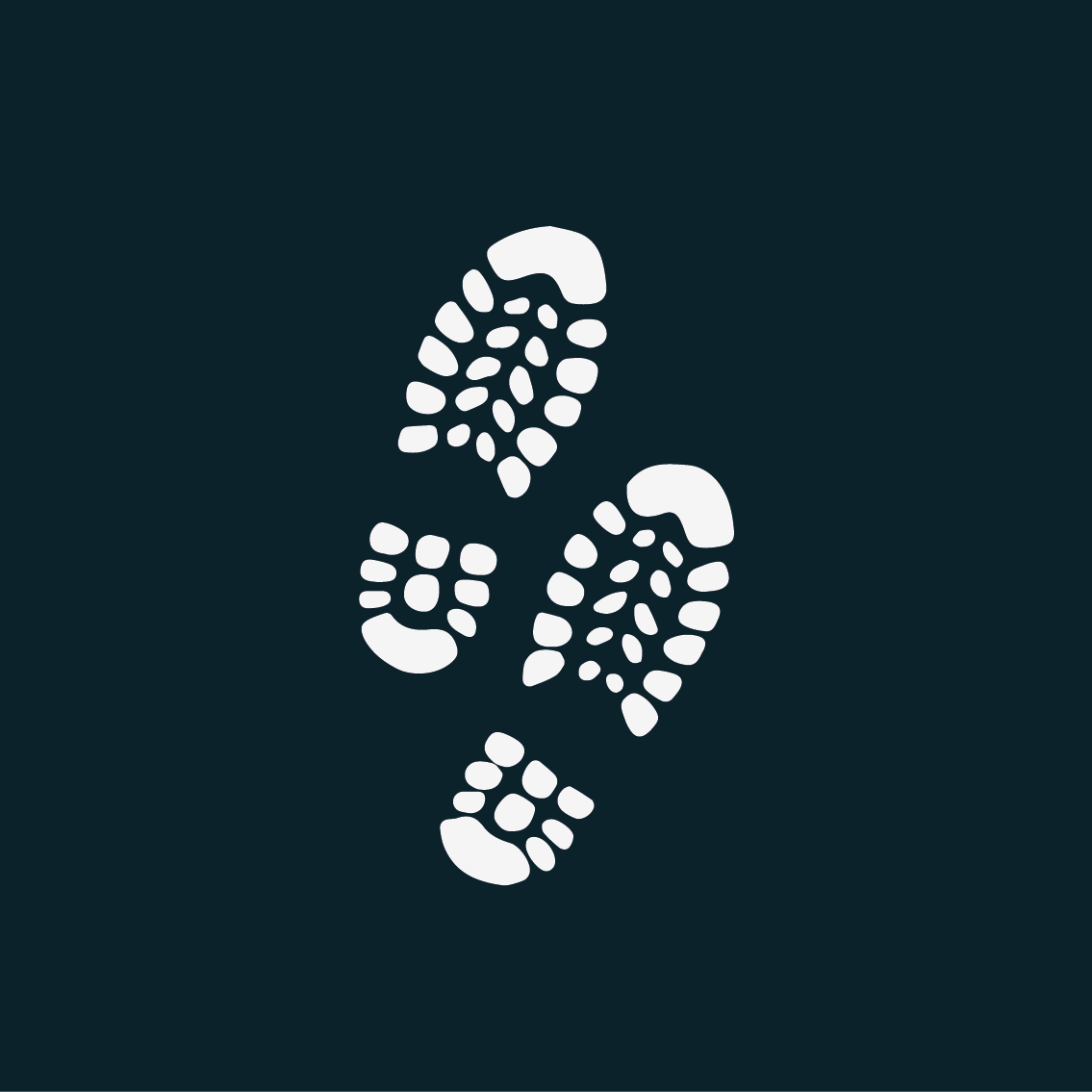
- Run for Heroes logo
- Genre: Charity
- Country: United Kingdom
- Founded: March 2020; 6 years ago
- Next event: 5kMay, previous events: Run5Donate5Nominate5, Faster 5k Fridays
- Major events: Running 5k
- Website: www.runforheroes.org.uk

Run for Heroes was born in March 2020 as a response to the COVID-19 pandemic. On March 28, 2020 they launched the #Run5Donate5Nominate5 campaign which raised over £7 million for NHS Charities Together COVID-19 Appeal.

The campaign went viral on Instagram with over a million runners participating globally, including celebrities such as Sir Mo Farah, Ellie Goulding, Princess Eugenie, Jimmy Carr, Dame Jessica Ennis-Hill, Nick Grimshaw, Nicola Sturgeon and DJ Chris Moyles. The campaign was also referred to as the 5k challenge.

== Background ==
Run for Heroes was founded by Olivia Strong, a 27-year-old documentary producer. Olivia thought of the idea while running around Arthur Seat in Edinburgh during lockdown in hope of raising £5,000 for NHS Charities Together COVID-19 Appeal. After launching the campaign, Olivia brought on India Pappalardo-Strachan (27) and Alice Taylor (27). India Pappalardo-Strachan branded Run For Heroes, while Alice Taylor pushed it out to press. The three women worked together over the course of a month to create a campaign that grew from £5 to £5 million.

== About ==
The "Run for Heroes" campaign was a grassroots initiative that emerged during the COVID-19 pandemic. It encouraged people to run, walk, or cycle 5 kilometers, donate £5 to NHS Charities Together, and nominate five others to do the same. The campaign gained widespread popularity on social media platforms like Instagram, where users shared photos and videos of their participation using the hashtag #RunForHeroes.

The campaign aimed to raise both funds for NHS charities, which support frontline healthcare workers, and awareness of the importance of exercise for physical and mental health during challenging times. It provided a way for people to contribute to the COVID-19 response effort while adhering to social distancing measures.

The simplicity of the campaign, combined with its charitable focus and emphasis on community participation, led to its rapid spread and engagement across various demographics. Many individuals, celebrities, and public figures joined in, further amplifying its reach and impact.

== Campaigns ==
=== Run 5, donate 5, nominate 5 ===
Run for Heroes are best known for their first viral fundraising campaign that asked people to run 5k, donate £5 and nominate 5 others to do the same. The campaign surpassed Virgin Money Giving records for an individual volunteer page, and in 24 hours raised over £1 million. This makes Run 5, Donate 5, Nominate 5 the largest viral fundraiser in the UK, and second globally after the Ice Bucket Challenge.

The 5k challenge also went viral in numerous other countries including the Netherlands, America, Canada, Spain and Australia. Altogether it raised around £8 million for COVID-19 causes globally.

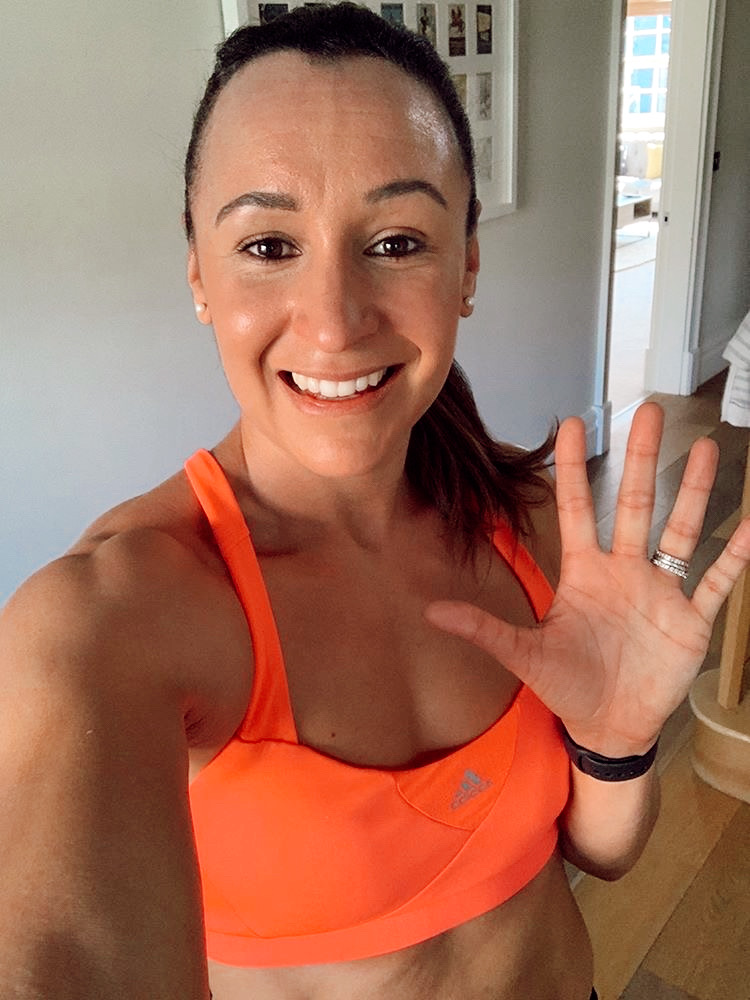
Jessica Ennis-Hill Run for Heroes

=== Faster 5k Fridays ===
Run for Heroes launched another challenge for The Care Workers Charity in partnership with Strava. It asked participants to run their fastest 5k every Friday for 5 weeks, raising over £20,000 for Charity.

=== #5kMay ===
In 2021, Run for Heroes partnered with JustGiving, HelloFresh, Zipcar, Strava, Vita Coco, Days and others to launch #5kMay. 5kMay asked participants to run, walk, cycle, wheel 5k, donate £5 to any charity across the UK, and nominate others to do the same.

The campaign raised a total of £175,000 for charities across the UK during the month of May 2021.

== Recognition and awards ==
The campaign was recognised by Boris Johnson with the Point of Lights award for outstanding volunteering. Olivia Strong was awarded the MBE in the Queen's Birthday Honours 2020 in recognition of her role as founder of Run for Heroes, and for services to fundraising during the COVID-19 pandemic.
