= Brensocatib =

Chemical compound

Clinical data
- Trade names: Brinsupri
- Other names: AZD7986; INS1007
- AHFS/Drugs.com: Monograph
- MedlinePlus: a625099
- License data: US DailyMed: Brensocatib
- Routes of administration: By mouth
- Drug class: Dipeptidyl peptidase 1 inhibitor
- ATC code: None

Legal status
- Legal status: US: ℞-only; EU: Rx-only

Identifiers
- IUPAC name: (2S)-N-[(1S)-1-cyano-2-[4-(3-methyl-2-oxo-1,3-benzoxazol-5-yl)phenyl]ethyl]-1,4-oxazepane-2-carboxamide
- CAS Number: 1802148-05-5
- PubChem CID: 118253852
- IUPHAR/BPS: 9412
- DrugBank: DB15638
- ChemSpider: 67896269
- UNII: 25CG88L0BB
- KEGG: D12120
- ChEMBL: ChEMBL3900409

Chemical and physical data
- Formula: C_{23}H_{24}N_{4}O_{4}
- Molar mass: 420.469 g·mol^{−1}
- 3D model (JSmol): Interactive image
- SMILES: CN1C2=C(C=CC(=C2)C3=CC=C(C=C3)C[C@@H](C#N)NC(=O)[C@@H]4CNCCCO4)OC1=O
- InChI: InChI=1S/C23H24N4O4/c1-27-19-12-17(7-8-20(19)31-23(27)29)16-5-3-15(4-6-16)11-18(13-24)26-22(28)21-14-25-9-2-10-30-21/h3-8,12,18,21,25H,2,9-11,14H2,1H3,(H,26,28)/t18-,21-/m0/s1; Key:AEXFXNFMSAAELR-RXVVDRJESA-N

Brensocatib, sold under the brand name Brinsupri, is a medication used for the treatment of bronchiectasis. It is a dipeptidyl peptidase 1 (DPP1) inhibitor. It is taken by mouth.

Brensocatib was approved for medical use in the United States in August 2025, and in the European Union in November 2025. The US Food and Drug Administration considers it to be a first-in-class medication.

== Medical uses ==
Brensocatib is indicated for the treatment of non-cystic fibrosis bronchiectasis in people aged twelve years of age and older.

== History ==
Bresocatib was discovered as a second generation DPP1 inhibitor, by scientists at AstraZeneca, eliminating aorta binding liabilities found with earlier compound series. A phase III clinical trial, known as the ASPEN trial, was conducted to evaluate the safety and efficacy of brensocatib in patients with non-cystic fibrosis bronchiectasis.

== Society and culture ==
=== Legal status ===
Brensocatib was approved for medical use in the United States in August 2025.

In October 2025, the Committee for Medicinal Products for Human Use of the European Medicines Agency adopted a positive opinion, recommending the granting of a marketing authorization for the medicinal product Brinsupri, intended for the treatment of non-cystic fibrosis bronchiectasis in people aged twelve years of age and older. The applicant for Brinsupri is Insmed Netherlands B.V. Brensocatib was authorized for medical use in the European Union in November 2025.

=== Names ===
Brensocatib is the international nonproprietary name.

Brensocatib is sold under the brand name Brinsupri.
