= Diacylglycerol diphosphate phosphatase =

Class of enzymes

Identifiers
- EC no.: 3.1.3.81

Databases
- IntEnz: IntEnz view
- BRENDA: BRENDA entry
- ExPASy: NiceZyme view
- KEGG: KEGG entry
- MetaCyc: metabolic pathway
- PRIAM: profile
- PDB structures: RCSB PDB PDBe PDBsum
Search
- PMC: articles
- PubMed: articles
- NCBI: proteins

Diacylglycerol diphosphate phosphatase (EC 3.1.3.81, DGPP phosphatase, DGPP phosphohydrolase, DPP1, DPPL1, DPPL2, PAP2, pyrophosphate phosphatase) is an enzyme with systematic name 1,2-diacyl-sn-glycerol 3-phosphate phosphohydrolase. This enzyme catalyses the following chemical reaction

1,2-diacyl-sn-glycerol 3-diphosphate + H_{2}O $\rightleftharpoons$ 1,2-diacyl-sn-glycerol 3-phosphate + phosphate

The phosphatase activity of this enzyme is Mg^{2+}-independent.
