= Cathepsin C =

Human protease (enzyme)

CTSC
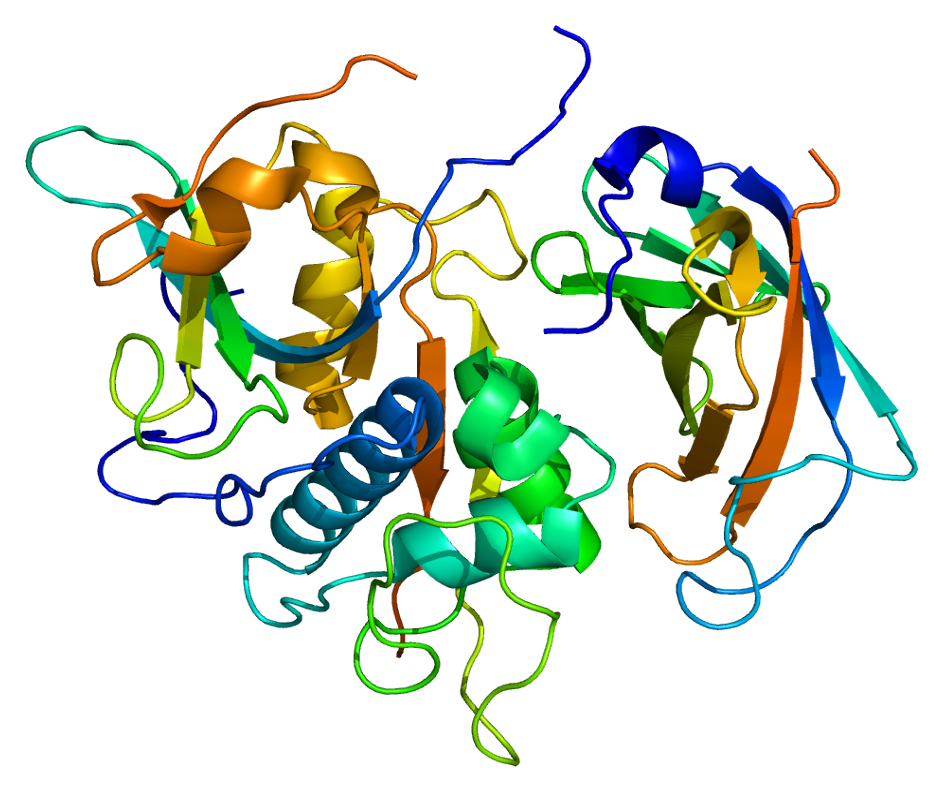

Identifiers
- Aliases: CTSC, CPPI, DPP-I, DPP1, DPPI, HMS, JP, JPD, PALS, PDON1, PLS, cathepsin C
- External IDs: OMIM: 602365; MGI: 109553; GeneCards: CTSC
Available structures
PDB	Ortholog search: PDBe RCSB
PDB	List of PDB id codes 4OEM, 1K3B, 2DJF, 2DJG, 3PDF, 4CDC, 4CDD, 4CDE, 4CDF, 4OEL
Enzyme activity
EC #	BRENDA	ExPASy	KEGG	MetaCyc
3.4.14.1	↗	↗	↗	↗

Gene location (Human)
Chr.	Chromosome 11 (human)
Band	11q14.2	Start	88,265,069 bp
Band	11q14.2	End	88,359,684 bp

Gene location (Mouse)
Chr.	Chromosome 7 (mouse)
Band	7|7 D3	Start	87,927,293 bp
Band	7|7 D3	End	87,960,096 bp
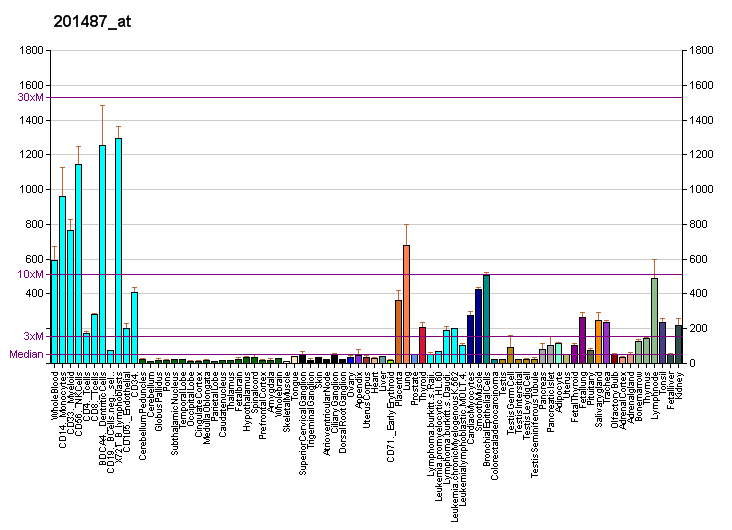
RNA expression pattern
Bgee	Human / Mouse (ortholog); Top expressed in: palpebral conjunctiva; epithelium of nasopharynx; stromal cell of endometrium; gallbladder; appendix; bronchial epithelial cell; lymph node; rectum; monocyte; granulocyte / Top expressed in: left lung lobe; right lung lobe; hair follicle; stroma of bone marrow; carotid body; yolk sac; parotid gland; primitive streak; ciliary body; conjunctival fornix; More reference expression data
BioGPS	More reference expression data
Gene ontology
Molecular function	peptidase activator activity involved in apoptotic process; phosphatase binding; cysteine-type peptidase activity; chaperone binding; protein self-association; peptidase activity; protein binding; identical protein binding; chloride ion binding; cysteine-type endopeptidase activity; serine-type endopeptidase activity; hydrolase activity
Cellular component	Golgi apparatus; endoplasmic reticulum lumen; membrane; endoplasmic reticulum; COPII-coated ER to Golgi transport vesicle; lysosome; extracellular exosome; endoplasmic reticulum-Golgi intermediate compartment membrane; Golgi membrane; extracellular region; extracellular space; nucleoplasm; centrosome; azurophil granule lumen; intracellular membrane-bounded organelle; collagen-containing extracellular matrix; cytoplasm
Biological process	ageing; positive regulation of proteolysis involved in cellular protein catabolic process; positive regulation of apoptotic signaling pathway; response to organic substance; proteolysis; endoplasmic reticulum to Golgi vesicle-mediated transport; COPII vesicle coating; immune response; proteolysis involved in cellular protein catabolic process; T cell mediated cytotoxicity; apoptotic process; neutrophil degranulation; negative regulation of myelination; positive regulation of microglial cell activation
Sources:Amigo / QuickGO
Orthologs
Databases	NCBI: entry; OMA: entry
Species	Human	Mouse
Entrez	1075	13032
Ensembl	ENSG00000109861	ENSMUSG00000030560
UniProt	P53634	P97821
RefSeq (mRNA)	NM_148170; NM_001114173; NM_001814	NM_009982; NM_001311790
RefSeq (protein)	NP_001107645; NP_001805; NP_680475	NP_001298719; NP_034112
Location (UCSC)	Chr 11: 88.27 – 88.36 Mb	Chr 7: 87.93 – 87.96 Mb
PubMed search
- Wikidata
View/Edit Human	View/Edit Mouse

Cathepsin C exclusion domain
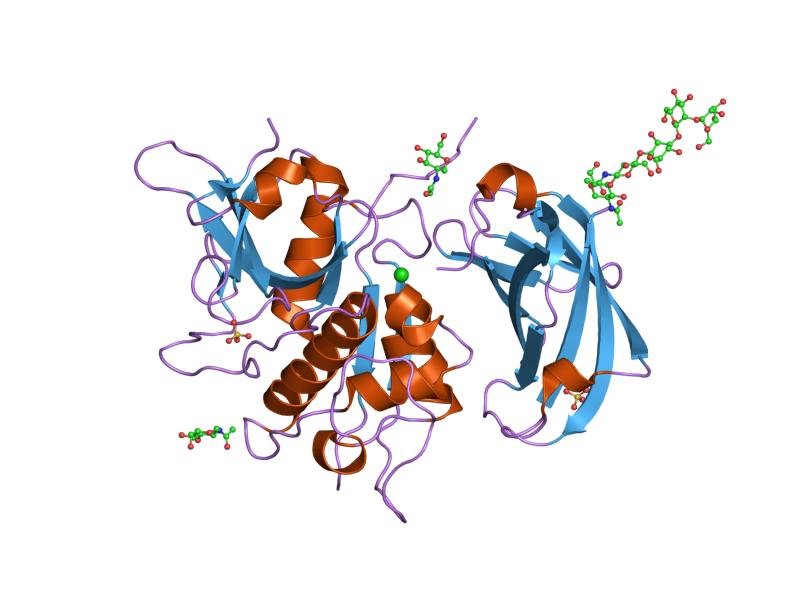
- re-determination of the native structure of human dipeptidyl peptidase i (cathepsin c)

Identifiers
- Symbol: CathepsinC_exc
- Pfam: PF08773
- InterPro: IPR014882
- SCOP2: 1k3b / SCOPe / SUPFAM
Available protein structures:
- PDB: IPR014882 PF08773 (ECOD; PDBsum)
- AlphaFold: IPR014882; PF08773

Cathepsin C (CTSC) also known as dipeptidyl peptidase I (DPP-I or DPP1) is a lysosomal exo-cysteine protease belonging to the peptidase C1 protein family, a subgroup of the cysteine cathepsins. In humans, it is encoded by the CTSC gene.

== Function ==
Cathepsin C appears to be a central coordinator for activation of many serine proteases in immune/inflammatory cells.

Cathepsin C catalyses excision of dipeptides from the N-terminus of protein and peptide substrates, except if (i) the amino group of the N-terminus is blocked, (ii) the site of cleavage is on either side of a proline residue, (iii) the N-terminal residue is lysine or arginine, or (iv) the structure of the peptide or protein prevents further digestion from the N-terminus.

=== Inflammatory response ===
Particularly, it is involved in activation of neutrophil serine proteases (NSPs; i.e., cathepsin G, proteinase 3 and neutrophil elastase) as they are synthesised as inactive proenzymes during neutrophil maturation. Then, they are released during degranulation. Other enzymes activated by cathepsin C are: chymase and tryptase in mast cells and granzymes A and B, cathepsin G, and elastase in lymphocytes and natural killer cells (NK cells).

Overactivation of NSPs causes a cascade of processes that result in excessive lung inflammation and reduced pathogen clearance. They involve reduced secretion of antileukoproteinase, extracellular matrix degradation, activation of IL-1β, IL-8 and TNF-α as well as inhibition of alpha-1 antitrypsin, an enzyme involved in NSP degradation.

== Structure ==
The cDNAs encoding rat, human, murine, bovine, dog and two Schistosome cathepsin Cs have been cloned and sequenced and show that the enzyme is highly conserved. The human and rat cathepsin C cDNAs encode precursors (prepro-cathepsin C) comprising signal peptides of 24 residues, pro-regions of 205 (rat cathepsin C) or 206 (human cathepsin C) residues and catalytic domains of 233 residues which contain the catalytic residues and are 30–40% identical to the mature amino acid sequences of papain and a number of other cathepsins including cathepsins, B, H, K, L, and S.

The translated prepro-cathepsin C is processed into the mature form by at least four cleavages of the polypeptide chain. The signal peptide is removed during translocation or secretion of the pro-enzyme (pro-cathepsin C) and a large N-terminal proregion fragment (also known as the exclusion domain), which is retained in the mature enzyme, is separated from the catalytic domain by excision of a minor C-terminal part of the pro-region, called the activation peptide. A heavy chain of about 164 residues and a light chain of about 69 residues are generated by cleavage of the catalytic domain.

Unlike the other members of the papain family, mature cathepsin C consists of four subunits, each composed of the N-terminal proregion fragment, the heavy chain and the light chain. Both the pro-region fragment and the heavy chain are glycosylated.

== Clinical significance ==
Defects in the encoded protein have been shown to be a cause of Papillon-Lefevre disease, an autosomal recessive disorder characterized by palmoplantar keratosis and periodontitis.

Inhibition of DPP-I addresses the inflammatory response that is thought to be responsible for one of many aspects of degenerative lung diseases, including bronchiectasis, chronic obstructive pulmonary disease (COPD), asthma and asthma-COPD overlap.

Brensocatib, a DPP-I inhibitor, was approved in 2025 by the FDA and the EMA to treat bronchiectasis.

Newer DPP-I inhibitors include florensocatib and verducatib.
