= Denosumab =

Human monoclonal antibody

Monoclonal antibody
- Type: Whole antibody
- Source: Human
- Target: RANK ligand

Clinical data
- Trade names: Prolia, Xgeva, others
- Other names: AMG-162
- Biosimilars: denosumab-adet, denosumab-bbdz, denosumab-bmwo, denosumab-bnht, denosumab-desu, denosumab-dssb, denosumab-kyqq, denosumab-mobz, denosumab-nxxp, denosumab-qbde, Acvybra, Aukelso, Bildyos, Bilprevda, Bomyntra, Boncresa, Bosaya, Conexxence, Degevma, Denbrayce, Enoby, Enwylma, Evfraxy, Izamby, Jubbonti, Jubereq, Junod, Kefdensis, Obodence, Osenvelt, Ospomyv, Osqay, Osvyrti, Oziltus, Ponlimsi, Stoboclo, Vevzuo, Vysribli, Wyost Xbonzy, Xbryk, Xtrenbo, Yaxwer, Zadenvi, Zvogra
- AHFS/Drugs.com: Monograph
- MedlinePlus: a610023
- License data: US DailyMed: Denosumab
- Pregnancy category: AU: D
- Routes of administration: Subcutaneous
- Drug class: Disease-modifying antirheumatic drug
- ATC code: M05BX04 (WHO)

Legal status
- Legal status: AU: S4 (Prescription only); CA: ℞-only / Schedule D; US: ℞-only; EU: Rx-only

Pharmacokinetic data
- Bioavailability: N/A
- Metabolism: Proteolysis

Identifiers
- CAS Number: 615258-40-7
- DrugBank: DB06643
- ChemSpider: none
- UNII: 4EQZ6YO2HI
- KEGG: D03684
- ChEMBL: ChEMBL1237023

Chemical and physical data
- Formula: C_{6404}H_{9912}N_{1724}O_{2004}S_{50}
- Molar mass: 144722.80 g·mol^{−1}

Denosumab, sold under the brand names Prolia and Xgeva among others, is a human monoclonal antibody used for the treatment of osteoporosis, treatment-induced bone loss, metastases to bone, and giant cell tumor of bone.

The most common side effects are joint and muscle pain in the arms or legs.

Denosumab is a human IgG2 monoclonal antibody that inhibits the protein RANKL (receptor activator of nuclear factor kappa-Β ligand). RANKL is essential for the formation, function and survival of decreasing the development of osteoclasts, which are cells that resorb (break down) bone. Denosumab binds to RANKL with high affinity and specificity, preventing the interaction between RANKL and RANK (receptor activator of nuclear factor-kappa B). This leads to a reduction in osteoclast numbers and function, and a decrease in bone resorption in cortical and trabecular bones, including cancer-induced bone destruction. It was developed by the biotechnology company Amgen.

== Medical uses ==
Denosumab (as Prolia) is indicated for the treatment of postmenopausal women with osteoporosis at high risk for fracture; to increase bone mass in men with osteoporosis at high risk for fracture; the treatment of glucocorticoid-induced osteoporosis in men and women at high risk for fracture; to increase bone mass in men at high risk for fracture receiving androgen deprivation therapy for nonmetastatic prostate cancer; to increase bone mass in women at high risk for fracture receiving adjuvant aromatase inhibitor therapy for breast cancer.

Denosumab (as Xgeva) is indicated for the prevention of skeletal-related events in people with multiple myeloma and in people with bone metastases from solid tumors; treatment of adults and skeletally mature adolescents with giant cell tumor of bone that is unresectable or where surgical resection is likely to result in severe morbidity; treatment of hypercalcemia of malignancy refractory to bisphosphonate therapy.

=== Cancer ===
A 2012 meta-analysis found that denosumab was better than placebo, zoledronic acid, and pamidronate, in reducing the risk of fractures in those with cancer.

=== Osteoporosis ===
In those with postmenopausal osteoporosis denosumab decreases the risk of fractures but increases the risk of infection. A 2013 review concluded that it is a reasonable treatment for postmenopausal osteoporosis. A 2017 review did not find benefit in males.

== Mechanism of action ==
Bone remodeling is the process by which the body continuously removes old bone tissue and replaces it with new bone. It is driven by various types of cells, most notably osteoblasts (which secrete new bone) and osteoclasts (which break down bone); osteocytes are also present in bone.

Precursors to osteoclasts, called pre-osteoclasts, express surface receptors called RANK (receptor activator of nuclear factor-kappa B). RANK is a member of the tumor necrosis factor receptor (TNFR) superfamily. RANK is activated by RANKL (the RANK-Ligand), which exists as cell surface molecules on osteoblasts. Activation of RANK by RANKL promotes the maturation of pre-osteoclasts into osteoclasts. Denosumab inhibits this maturation of osteoclasts by binding to and inhibiting RANKL. Denosumab mimics the natural action of osteoprotegerin, an endogenous RANKL inhibitor, that presents with decreasing concentrations (and perhaps decreased effectiveness) in people with osteoporosis. This protects bone from degradation, and helps to counter the progression of the disease.

== Contraindications and interactions ==
It is contraindicated in people with hypocalcemia; sufficient calcium and vitamin D levels must be reached before starting on denosumab therapy. Data regarding interactions with other drugs are missing. It is unlikely that denosumab exhibits any clinically relevant interactions.

Denosumab works by lowering the hormonal message that leads to excessive osteoclast-driven bone removal and is active in the body for only six months. Similarly to bisphosphonates, denosumab appears to be implicated in increasing the risk of osteonecrosis of the jaw (ONJ) following extraction of teeth or oral surgical procedures but, unlike bisphosphonate, the risk declines to zero approximately 6 months after injection. Invasive dental procedures should be avoided during this time.

== Adverse effects ==
The most common side effects are joint and muscle pain in the arms or legs. There is an increased risk of infections such as cellulitis, hypocalcemia (low blood calcium), hypersensitivity allergy reactions, osteonecrosis of the jaw, and atypical femur fractures. Another trial showed significantly increased rates of eczema and hospitalization due to infections of the skin. It has been proposed that the increase in infections under denosumab treatment might be connected to the role of RANKL in the immune system. RANKL is expressed by T helper cells, and is thought to be involved in dendritic cell maturation.

Discontinuation of denosumab is associated with a rebound increase in bone turnover. In rare cases this has led to severe hypercalcemia, but is common in children. Vertebral compression fractures have also occurred in some people after discontinuing treatment.

== Society and culture ==
=== Legal status ===
==== United States ====
In August 2009, a meeting was held between Amgen and the Advisory Committee for Reproductive Health Drugs (ACRHD) of the U.S. Food and Drug Administration (FDA) to review the potential uses of denosumab.

In October 2009, the FDA delayed approval of denosumab, stating that it needed more information.

In June 2010, denosumab was approved by the FDA for use in postmenopausal women with risk of osteoporosis under the brand name Prolia, and in November 2010, as Xgeva for the prevention of skeleton-related events in people with bone metastases from solid tumors. Denosumab is the first RANKL inhibitor to be approved by the FDA.

In June 2013, the FDA approved denosumab for treatment of adults and skeletally mature adolescents with giant cell tumor of bone that is unresectable or where resection would result in significant morbidity.

In January 2024, the FDA added a boxed warning to the prescription label for Prolia because of the risk of severe hypocalcemia in those with advanced kidney disease. An FDA review found that Prolia had resulted in "hospitalization, life-threatening events, and death" in that population.

In March 2024, the FDA approved applications from Sandoz for Jubbonti (denosumab-bbdz), a biosimilar to Prolia; and Wyost (denosumab-bbdz), a biosimilar to Xgeva.

In February 2025, the FDA approved denosumab-dssb, sold under the brand name Ospomyv, as a biosimiar to Prolia; and also sold under the brand name Xbryk as a biosimilar to Xgeva.

In February 2025, the FDA approved denosumab-bmwo, sold under the brand name Stoboclo, as a biosimiar to Prolia; and sold under the brand name Osenvelt as a biosimilar to Xgeva.

In March 2025, the FDA approved denosumab-bnht, sold under the brand name Bomyntra, as a biosimiar to Prolia; and sold under the brand name Conexxence as a biosimilar to Xgeva.

In September 2025, denosumab-qbde (Enoby), a biosimiar to Prolia; and denosumab-qbde (Xtrenbo) a biosimilar to Xgeva were approved for medical use in the United States.

In October 2025, denosumab-desu (Jubereq), a biosimilar to Xgeva; and denosumab-desu (Osvyrti), a biosimilar to Prolia were approved for medical use in the United States.

In December 2025, denosumab-mobz (Boncresa), a biosimilar to Prolia; and denosumab-mobz (Oziltus), a biosimilar to Xgeva were approved for medical use in the United States.

In March 2026, denosumab-adet (Ponlimsi), a biosimilar to Prolia was approved for medical use in the United States.

In September 2026, denosumab-adet (Degevma), a biosimilar to Xgeva, was approved for medical use in the United States.

==== European Union ====
In December 2009, the Committee for Medicinal Products for Human Use (CHMP) of the European Medicines Agency issued a positive opinion for denosumab for the treatment of postmenopausal osteoporosis in women and for the treatment of bone loss in men with hormone ablation therapy for prostate cancer. Denosumab, as Prolia, was authorized for medical use in the EU in May 2010, and as Xgeva in July 2011.

In March 2024, the CHMP adopted a positive opinion, recommending the granting of a marketing authorization for the medicinal product Jubbonti, intended for the treatment of osteoporosis in women who have been through menopause and in men at increased risk of fractures whose bone loss is linked to hormone ablation or long-term treatment with systemic glucocorticoid. The applicant for this medicinal product is Sandoz GmbH. In March 2024, the CHMP adopted a positive opinion, recommending the granting of a marketing authorization for the medicinal product Wyost, intended for the prevention of bone complications in adults with advanced cancer involving bone and for the treatment of adults and skeletally mature adolescents with giant cell tumor of bone. The applicant for this medicinal product is Sandoz GmbH. Denosumab, as Wyost, a biosimilar, was authorized for medical use in the EU in May 2024 for all indications of denosumab treated by Xgeva. Denosumab, as Jubbonti, a biosimilar, was authorized for medical use in the EU in May 2024 for all indications of denosumab treated by Prolia.

In November 2024, the CHMP adopted a positive opinion, recommending the granting of a marketing authorization for the medicinal product Obodence, intended for the treatment of osteoporosis in women who have been through menopause, treatment of bone loss linked to hormone ablation in men at increased risk of fractures, or treatment of bone loss associated with long-term treatment with systemic glucocorticoid. The applicant for this medicinal product is Samsung Bioepis NL B.V. Obodence is a biosimilar medicinal product that is highly similar to the reference product Prolia (denosumab), which was authorized in the EU in May 2010. Obodence was authorized for medical use in the EU in February 2025.

In November 2024, the CHMP adopted a positive opinion, recommending the granting of a marketing authorization for the medicinal product Xbryk, intended for the prevention of bone complications in adults with advanced cancer involving bone and for the treatment of adults and skeletally mature adolescents with giant cell tumor of bone. The applicant for this medicinal product is Samsung Bioepis NL B.V. Xbryk is a biosimilar medicinal product that is highly similar to the reference product Xgeva (denosumab), which was authorized in the EU in July 2011. Xbryk was authorized for medical use in the EU in February 2025.

In December 2024, the CHMP adopted a positive opinion, recommending the granting of a marketing authorization for the medicinal product Osenvelt, intended for the prevention of bone complications in adults with advanced cancer involving bone and for the treatment of adults and skeletally mature adolescents with giant cell tumor of bone. The applicant for this medicinal product is Celltrion Healthcare Hungary Kft. Osenvelt is a biosimilar medicinal product that is highly similar to the reference product Xgeva which was authorized in the EU in July 2011. Osenvelt was authorized for medical use in the EU in February 2025.

In December 2024, the CHMP adopted a positive opinion, recommending the granting of a marketing authorization for the medicinal product Stoboclo, intended for the treatment of osteoporosis in women who have been through menopause, bone loss linked to hormone ablation in men at increased risk of fractures and bone loss associated with long-term treatment with systemic glucocorticoid. The applicant for this medicinal product is Celltrion Healthcare Hungary Kft. Stoboclo is a biosimilar medicinal product that is highly similar to the reference product Prolia, which was authorized in the EU in May 2010. Stoboclo was authorized for medical use in the EU in February 2025.

In March 2025, the CHMP adopted a positive opinion, recommending the granting of a marketing authorization for the medicinal product Jubereq, intended for the prevention of skeletal-related events in adults with advanced malignancies involving bone and the treatment of adults and skeletally mature adolescents with giant cell tumor of bone. The applicant for this medicinal product is Accord Healthcare S.L.U. Jubereq is a biosimilar medicinal product that is highly similar to the reference product Xgeva (denosumab), which was authorized in the EU in July 2011. Jubereq was authorized for medical use in the EU in May 2025.

In March 2025, the CHMP adopted a positive opinion, recommending the granting of a marketing authorization for the medicinal product Osvyrti, intended for the treatment of osteoporosis in women who have been through menopause, in men with prostate cancer who are at increased risk of fractures and whose bone loss is linked to hormone ablation, and people whose bone loss is linked to long-term treatment with systemic glucocorticoid. The applicant for this medicinal product is Accord Healthcare S.L.U. Osvyrti is a biosimilar medicinal product that is highly similar to the reference product Prolia (denosumab), which was authorized in the EU in May 2010. Osvyrti was authorized for medical use in the EU in May 2025.

In April 2025, the CHMP adopted a positive opinion, recommending the granting of a marketing authorization for the medicinal product Denosumab BBL, intended for the treatment of osteoporosis in women who have been through menopause, treatment of bone loss linked to hormone ablation in men at increased risk of fractures or treatment of bone loss associated with long-term treatment with systemic glucocorticoid. The applicant for this medicinal product is Biosimilar Collaborations Ireland Limited. Denosumab BBL is a biosimilar medicinal product that is highly similar to the reference product Prolia (denosumab), which was authorized in the EU in May 2010. Denosumab BBL, as Evfraxy, was authorized for medical use in the EU in June 2025.

In May 2025, the CHMP adopted a positive opinion, recommending the granting of a marketing authorization for the medicinal product Conexxence, intended for the treatment of osteoporosis in women who have been through menopause, bone loss linked to hormone ablation in men with prostate cancer who are at increased risk of fractures, and bone loss in adults linked to long-term treatment with systemic glucocorticoid. The applicant for this medicinal product is Fresenius Kabi Deutschland GmbH. Conexxence is a biosimilar medicinal product that is highly similar to the reference product Prolia (denosumab), which was authorized in the EU in May 2010. Conexxence was authorized for medical use in the EU in July 2025.

In July 2025, the CHMP adopted a positive opinion, recommending the granting of a marketing authorization for the medicinal product Bildyos, intended for the treatment of osteoporosis in women who have been through menopause and men who are at increased risk of fractures, treatment of bone loss linked to hormone ablation in men with prostate cancer who are at increased risk of fractures or treatment of bone loss in adults linked to long-term treatment with systemic glucocorticoid. The applicant for this medicinal product is Henlius Europe GmbH. Bildyos is a biosimilar medicinal product that is highly similar to the reference product Prolia, which was authorized in the EU in May 2010. Bildyos was authorized for medical use in the EU in September 2025.

In July 2025, the CHMP adopted a positive opinion, recommending the granting of a marketing authorization for the medicinal product Bilprevda, intended for the prevention of skeletal-related events in adults with advanced malignancies involving bone and the treatment of adults and skeletally mature adolescents with giant cell tumor of bone. The applicant for this medicinal product is Henlius Europe GmbH. Bilprevda is a biosimilar medicinal product that is highly similar to the reference product Xgeva, which was authorized in the EU in July 2011. Bilprevda was authorized for medical use in the EU in September 2025.

In September 2025, the CHMP adopted a positive opinion, recommending the granting of a marketing authorization for the medicinal products Acvybra, Kefdensis, and Ponlimsi. Acvybra, Kefdensis, and Ponlimsi are biosimilar medicinal products that are highly similar to the reference product Prolia. The applicant for Acvybra is Reddy Holding GmbH, the applicant for Kefdensis is STADA Arzneimittel AG, and the applicant for Ponlimsi is Teva GmbH. Acvybra was authorized for medical use in the European Union in November 2025. Kefdensis was authorized for medical use in the European Union in November 2025. Ponlimsi was authorized for medical use in the European Union in November 2025.

In September 2025, the CHMP adopted a positive opinion, recommending the granting of a marketing authorization for the medicinal products Degevma, Xbonzy, and Zvogra intended for the prevention of bone complications in adults with advanced cancer involving bone and for the treatment of adults and skeletally mature adolescents with giant cell tumor of bone. Degevma, Xbonzy, and Zvogra are biosimilar medicinal products that are highly similar to the reference product Xgeva. The applicant for Degevma is TEVA GmbH, the applicant for Xbonzy is Reddy Holding GmbH, and the applicant for Zvogra is Stada Arzneimittel AG. Degevma was authorized for medical use in the European Union in November 2025. Xbonzy was authorized for medical use in the European Union in November 2025. Zvogra was authorized for medical use in the European Union in November 2025.

In November 2025, the CHMP adopted a positive opinion, recommending the granting of a marketing authorization for the medicinal product Osqay, intended for the treatment of osteoporosis in women who have been through menopause and men who are at increased risk of fractures, treatment of bone loss linked to hormone ablation in men with prostate cancer who are at increased risk of fractures or treatment of bone loss in adults associated with long-term treatment with systemic glucocorticoid. The applicant for this medicinal product is Theramex Ireland Ltd. Osqay is a biosimilar medicinal product that is highly similar to the reference product Prolia. Osqay was authorized for medical use in the European Union in January 2026.

==== Canada ====
Health Canada approved Jubbonti, a biosimilar to Prolia, in February 2024; and approved Wyost, a biosimilar to Xgeva, in March 2024.

In September 2025, Osenvelt, a biosimilar of Xgeva; and Stoboclo, a biosimilar of Prolia, were authorized for medical use in Canada.
