= Osteoimmunology =

Osteoimmunology (όστέον, osteon from Greek, "bone"; immunitas from Latin, "immunity"; and λόγος, logos, from Greek "study") is a field that emerged about 40 years ago that studies the interface between the skeletal system and the immune system, comprising the "osteo-immune system". Osteoimmunology also studies the shared components and mechanisms between the two systems in vertebrates, including ligands, receptors, signaling molecules and transcription factors. Over the past decade, osteoimmunology has been investigated clinically for the treatment of bone metastases, rheumatoid arthritis (RA), osteoporosis, osteopetrosis, and periodontitis. Studies in osteoimmunology reveal relationships between molecular communication among blood cells and structural pathologies in the body.

== System similarities ==
The RANKL-RANK-OPG axis (OPG stands for osteoprotegerin) is an example of an important signaling system functioning both in bone and immune cell communication. RANKL is expressed on osteoblasts and activated T cells, whereas RANK is expressed on osteoclasts, and dendritic cells (DCs), both of which can be derived from myeloid progenitor cells. Surface RANKL on osteoblasts as well as secreted RANKL provide necessary signals for osteoclast precursors to differentiate into osteoclasts. RANKL expression on activated T cells leads to DC activation through binding to RANK expressed on DCs. OPG, produced by DCs, is a soluble decoy receptor for RANKL that competitively inhibits RANKL binding to RANK.

== Crosstalk ==
The bone marrow cavity is important for the proper development of the immune system, and houses important stem cells for maintenance of the immune system. Within this space, as well as outside of it, cytokines produced by immune cells also have important effects on regulating bone homeostasis. Some important cytokines that are produced by the immune system, including RANKL, M-CSF, TNFa, ILs, and IFNs, affect the differentiation and activity of osteoclasts and bone resorption. Such inflammatory osteoclastogenesis and osteoclast activation can be seen in ex vivo primary cultures of cells from the inflamed synovial fluid of patients with disease flare of the autoimmune disease rheumatoid arthritis.

== Clinical osteoimmunology ==
Clinical osteoimmunology is a field that studies a treatment or prevention of the bone related diseases caused by disorders of the immune system. Aberrant and/or prolonged activation of immune system leads to derangement of bone modeling and remodeling. Common diseases caused by disorder of osteoimmune system is osteoporosis and bone destruction accompanied by RA characterized by high infiltration of CD4+ T cells in rheumatoid joints, in which two mechanisms are involved: One is an indirect effect on osteoclastogenesis from rheumatoid synovial cells in joints since synovial cells have osteoclast precursors and osteoclast supporting cells, synovial macrophages are highly differentiated into osteoclasts with help of RANKL released from osteoclast supporting cells. The second is an indirect effect on osteoclast differentiation and activity by the secretion of inflammatory cytokines such as IL-1, IL-6, TNFa, in synovium of RA, which increase RANKL signaling and finally bone destruction. A clinical approach to prevent bone related diseases caused by RA is OPG and RANKL treatment in arthritis. There is some evidence that infections (e.g. respiratory virus infection) can reduce the numbers of osteoblasts in bone, the key cells involved in bone formation.

== See also ==
- Bone metabolism
- Osteoimmunology and Osseointegration
- HSC
- Osteoarthritis
