= FREEDOM trial =

FREEDOM trial can refer to either of :

- the phase 3 clinical trial of Denosumab in osteoporosis,
- "Future REvascularization Evaluation in patients with. Diabetes mellitus: Optimal management of Multivessel disease" a clinical trial to compare drug-eluting stents with CABG.
