= FORL =

FORL may refer to:

- Feline odontoclastic resorptive lesion, a dental disease in cats
- Fort Wayne Line, a rail line in northeastern United States
- Friends of Real Lancashire, an outsider pressure group whose aim is the restoration of the historic boundaries of the Lancashire ceremonial county
- Freedom of Russia Legion, a Ukrainian military unit formed of Russian defectors
