= Odanacatib =

Chemical compound

Clinical data
- Other names: (2S)-N-(1-Cyanocyclopropyl)-4-fluoro-4-methyl-2-{[(1S)-2,2,2-trifluoro-1-{4'-(methanesulfonyl)-[1,1'-biphenyl]-4-yl}ethyl]amino}pentanamide
- Routes of administration: By mouth
- ATC code: None

Legal status
- Legal status: Development terminated

Identifiers
- IUPAC name: N-(1-Cyanocyclopropyl)-4-fluoro-N^{2}-{(1S)-2,2,2-trifluoro-1-[4'-(methylsulfonyl)biphenyl-4-yl]ethyl}-L-leucinamide
- CAS Number: 603139-19-1
- PubChem CID: 10152654
- IUPHAR/BPS: 6478
- ChemSpider: 8328162
- UNII: N673F6W2VH
- KEGG: D08955
- ChEMBL: ChEMBL481611
- CompTox Dashboard (EPA): DTXSID40209075
- ECHA InfoCard: 100.207.747

Chemical and physical data
- Formula: C_{25}H_{27}F_{4}N_{3}O_{3}S
- Molar mass: 525.56 g·mol^{−1}
- 3D model (JSmol): Interactive image
- SMILES: CC(C)(CC(C(=O)NC1(CC1)C#N)NC(C2=CC=C(C=C2)C3=CC=C(C=C3)S(=O)(=O)C)C(F)(F)F)F
- InChI: InChI=1S/C25H27F4N3O3S/c1-23(2,26)14-20(22(33)32-24(15-30)12-13-24)31-21(25(27,28)29)18-6-4-16(5-7-18)17-8-10-19(11-9-17)36(3,34)35/h4-11,20-21,31H,12-14H2,1-3H3,(H,32,33)/t20-,21-/m0/s1; Key:FWIVDMJALNEADT-SFTDATJTSA-N

Odanacatib (INN; codenamed MK-0822) is an investigational treatment for osteoporosis and bone metastasis. It is an inhibitor of cathepsin K, an enzyme involved in bone resorption.

The drug was developed by Merck & Co. The phase III clinical trial for this medicine was stopped early after a review showed it was highly effective and had a good safety profile. Merck announced in 2014 that it would apply for regulatory approval in 2015.

In 2016, Merck discontinued development of odanacatib and announced it would not seek regulatory approval after analysis discovered an increased risk of stroke.

This drug was developed at Merck Frosst in Montreal.
