= Cathepsin K =

Protein found in humans

CTSK
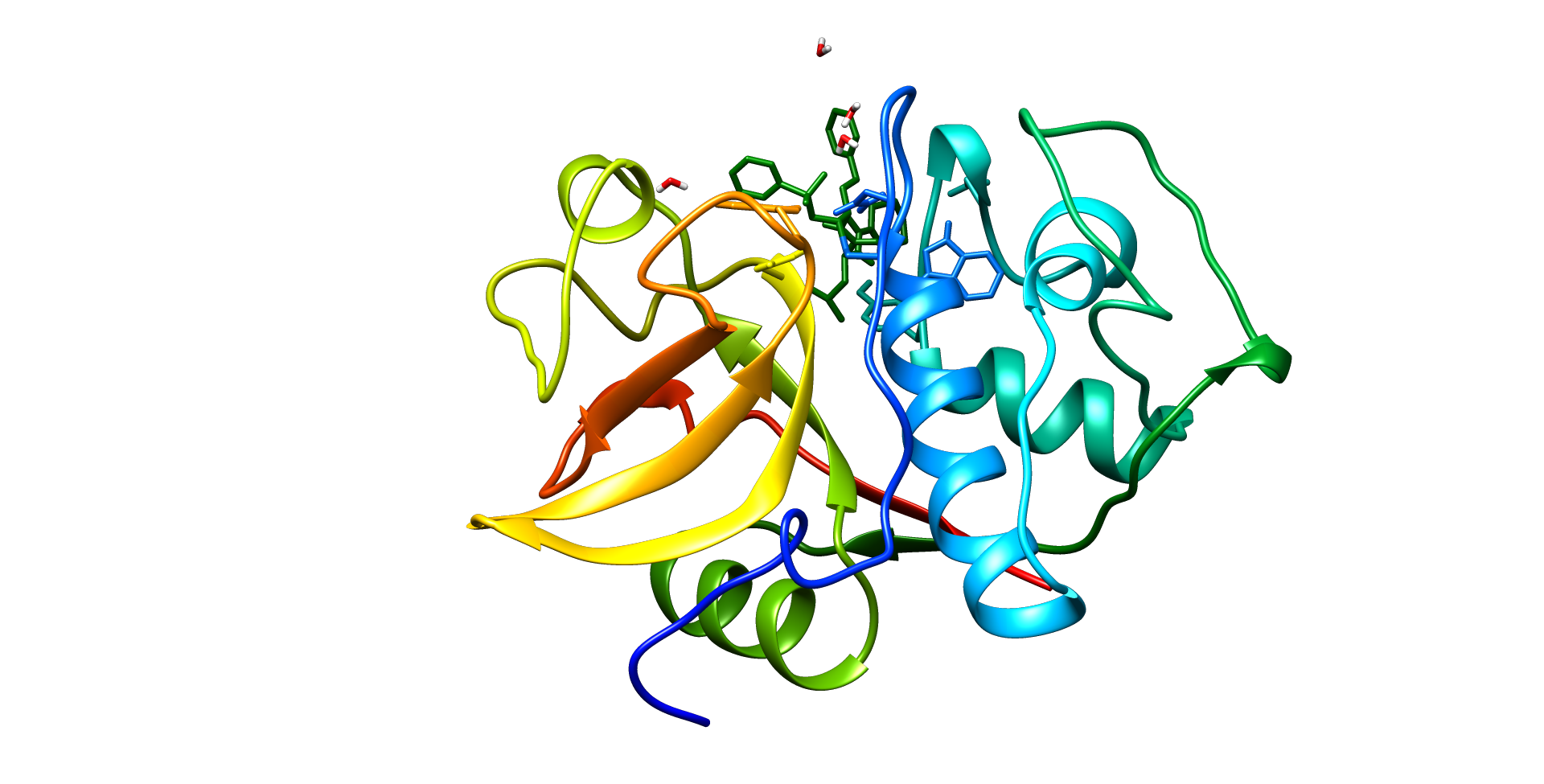

Identifiers
- Aliases: CTSK, CTS02, CTSO, CTSO1, CTSO2, PKND, PYCD, cathepsin K
- External IDs: OMIM: 601105; MGI: 107823; GeneCards: CTSK
Available structures
PDB	Ortholog search: PDBe RCSB
PDB	List of PDB id codes 1MEM, 3KWB, 3KX1, 4X6J, 1AYW, 3KW9, 1YT7, 1AU2, 4X6H, 1Q6K, 1YK7, 1ATK, 3C9E, 1AYV, 1BGO, 4N8W, 7PCK, 4DMX, 4X6I, 1NL6, 1TU6, 3O0U, 1AU4, 3OVZ, 3KWZ, 2ATO, 3O1G, 1AU0, 1BY8, 1SNK, 2AUZ, 4DMY, 4N79, 1AYU, 1U9X, 1YK8, 1AU3, 1U9V, 2BDL, 1VSN, 1U9W, 2AUX, 2R6N, 3H7D, 1NLJ, 5J94, 4YVA, 4YV8
Enzyme activity
EC #	BRENDA	ExPASy	KEGG	MetaCyc
3.4.22.38	↗	↗	↗	↗

Gene location (Human)
Chr.	Chromosome 1 (human)
Band	1q21.3	Start	150,794,880 bp
Band	1q21.3	End	150,809,577 bp

Gene location (Mouse)
Chr.	Chromosome 3 (mouse)
Band	3 F2.1|3 40.74 cM	Start	95,406,567 bp
Band	3 F2.1|3 40.74 cM	End	95,416,673 bp
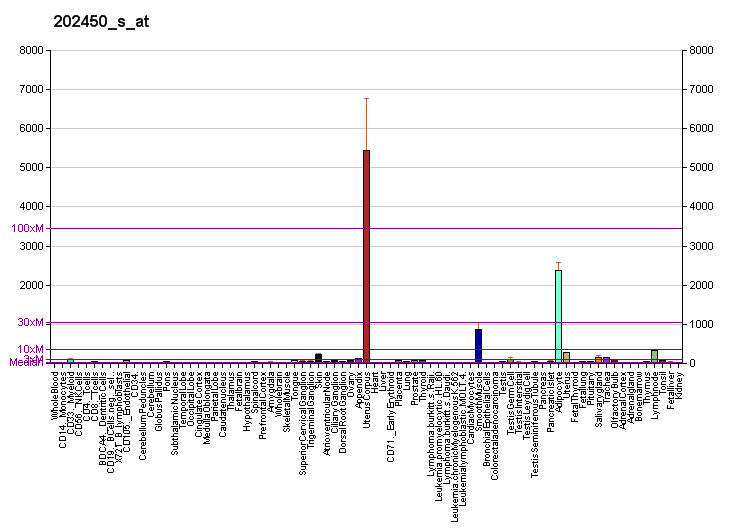
RNA expression pattern
Bgee	Human / Mouse (ortholog); Top expressed in: periodontal fiber; skin of hip; stromal cell of endometrium; gallbladder; tibia; gastric mucosa; skin of thigh; canal of the cervix; decidua; ectocervix / Top expressed in: body of femur; calvaria; decidua; tibiofemoral joint; ankle; skin of external ear; vestibular sensory epithelium; stroma of bone marrow; gastrula; ankle joint; More reference expression data
BioGPS	More reference expression data
Gene ontology
Molecular function	fibronectin binding; cysteine-type peptidase activity; collagen binding; peptidase activity; protein binding; cysteine-type endopeptidase activity; hydrolase activity; proteoglycan binding; serine-type endopeptidase activity
Cellular component	cytoplasm; extracellular region; endolysosome lumen; lysosome; extracellular space; nucleoplasm; intracellular membrane-bounded organelle; lysosomal lumen
Biological process	intramembranous ossification; positive regulation of protein targeting to mitochondrion; extracellular matrix disassembly; bone resorption; proteolysis; toll-like receptor signaling pathway; regulation of autophagy of mitochondrion; collagen catabolic process; proteolysis involved in cellular protein catabolic process; regulation of keratinocyte differentiation
Sources:Amigo / QuickGO
Orthologs
Databases	NCBI: entry; OMA: entry
Species	Human	Mouse
Entrez	1513	13038
Ensembl	ENSG00000143387	ENSMUSG00000028111
UniProt	P43235	P55097
RefSeq (mRNA)	NM_000396	NM_007802
RefSeq (protein)	NP_000387	NP_031828
Location (UCSC)	Chr 1: 150.79 – 150.81 Mb	Chr 3: 95.41 – 95.42 Mb
PubMed search
- Wikidata
View/Edit Human	View/Edit Mouse

Cathepsin K, abbreviated CTSK, is an enzyme that in humans is encoded by the CTSK gene.

== Function ==
The protein encoded by this gene is a cysteine cathepsin, a lysosomal cysteine protease involved in bone remodeling and resorption. This protein, which is a member of the peptidase C1 protein family, is expressed predominantly in osteoclasts.

Cathepsin K is a protease, which is defined by its high specificity for kinins, that is involved in bone resorption. The enzyme's ability to catabolize elastin, collagen, and gelatin allows it to break down bone and cartilage. This catabolic activity is also partially responsible for the loss of lung elasticity and recoil in emphysema. Cathepsin K inhibitors show great potential in the treatment of osteoporosis. Cathepsin K is degraded by Cathepsin S, in a process referred to as Controlled Cathepsin Cannibalism.

Cathepsin K expression is stimulated by inflammatory cytokines that are released after tissue injury.

== Clinical significance ==
Cathepsin K is expressed in a significant fraction of human breast cancers, where it could contribute to tumor invasiveness. Mutations in this gene are the cause of pycnodysostosis, an autosomal recessive disease characterized by osteosclerosis and short stature. Cathepsin K has also been found to be over-expressed in glioblastoma.

That the expression of cathepsin K is characteristic for some cancers and not others has been documented. Cathepsin K antibodies are marketed for research into expression of this enzyme by various cells.

Merck had a cathepsin K inhibitor, odanacatib, in Phase III clinical trials for osteoporosis. In September, 2016, Merck announced they were discontinuing development of odanacatib after their own assessment of adverse events and an independent assessment showed increased risk of stroke. Other cathepsin K inhibitors are in various stages of development. Medivir has a cathepsin K inhibitor, MIV-711 (L-006235), in Phase IIa clinical trial, as a disease modifying osteoarthritis drug, as of October 2017.

== Additional images ==
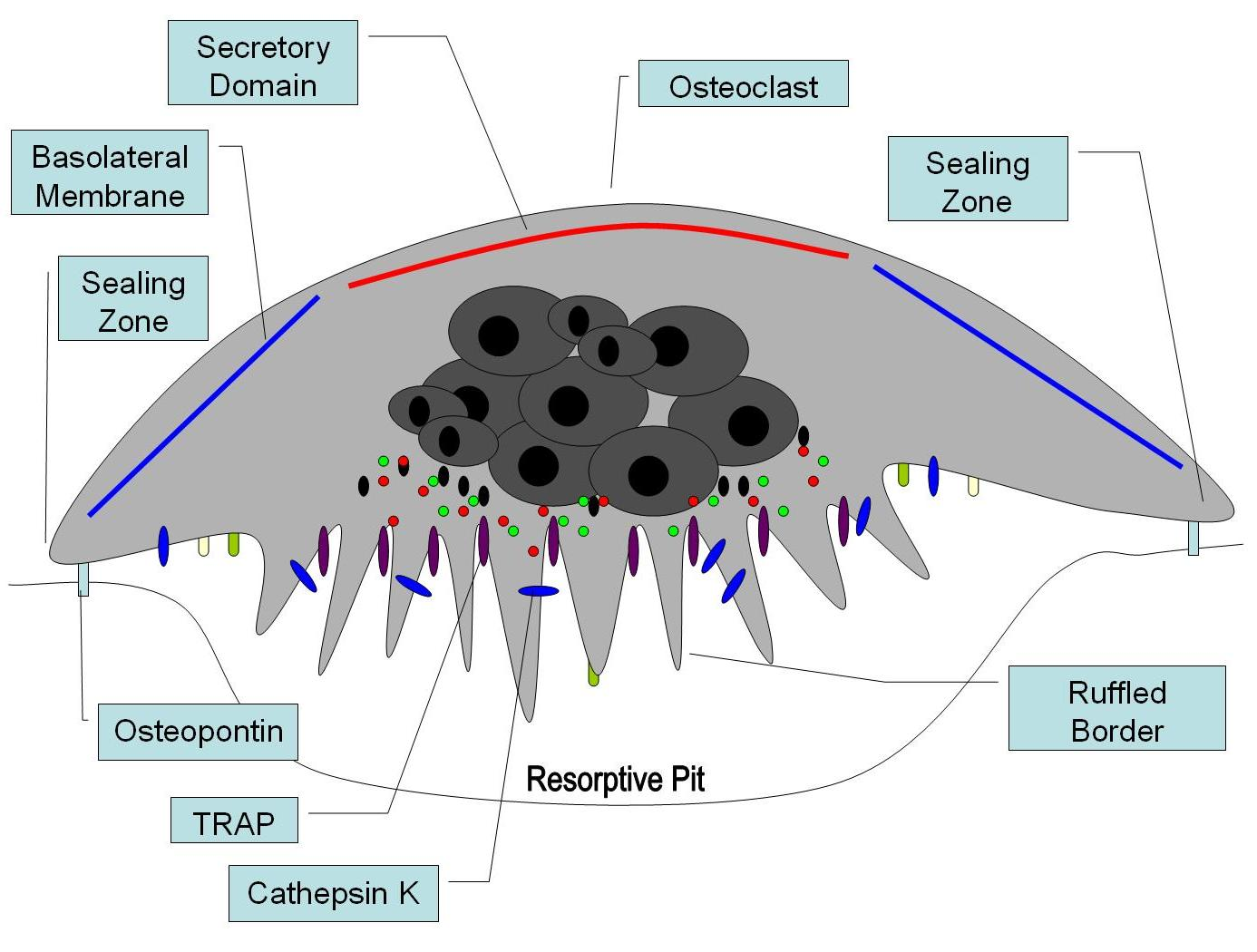
Osteoclast
