= Osteoclast =

Cell that removes bone tissue

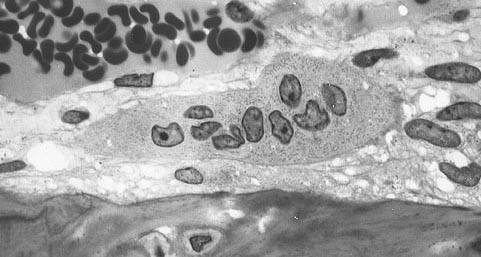
- Light micrograph of an osteoclast displaying typical distinguishing characteristics: a large cell with multiple nuclei and a "foamy" cytosol.

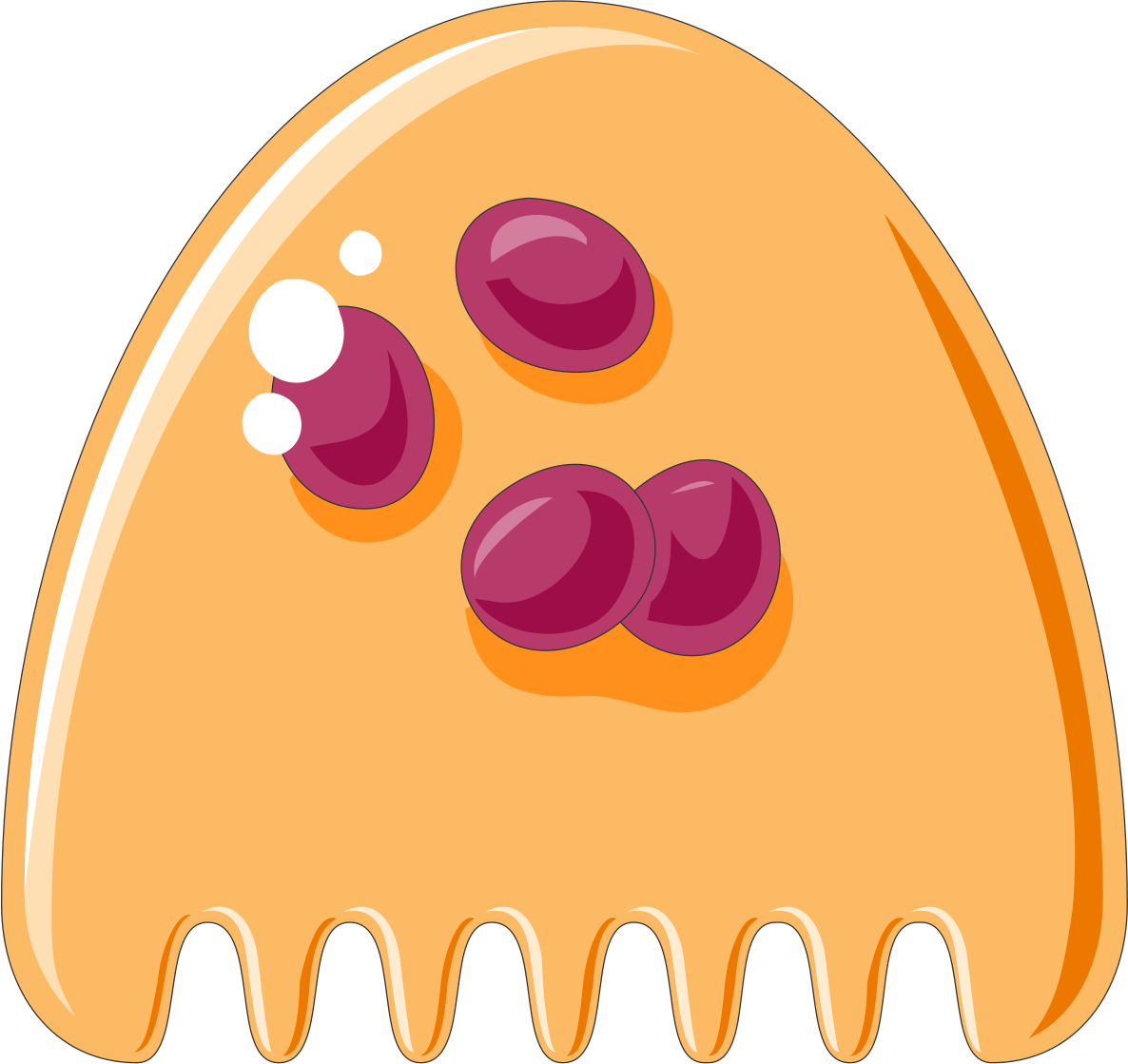
- Illustration showing a single osteoclast

Details
- Precursor: osteoclast progenitors
- Location: Bone
- Function: Removal of bone tissue

Identifiers
- Latin: osteoclastus
- MeSH: D010010
- TH: H2.00.03.7.00005
- FMA: 66781

An osteoclast (from Ancient Greek ὀστέον (osteon) 'bone' and κλαστός (clastos) 'broken') is a type of bone cell that removes bone tissue. This function is critical in the maintenance, repair, and remodeling of bones of the vertebral skeleton. The osteoclast disassembles and digests the composite of hydrated protein and mineral at a molecular level by secreting acid and a collagenase, a process known as bone resorption. This process also helps regulate the level of blood calcium. An odontoclast (/oʊˈdɒn.tə.klæst, -ɑːst/) is an osteoclast associated with the absorption of the roots of deciduous teeth.

Osteoclasts are found on those surfaces of bone that are undergoing resorption. On such surfaces, the osteoclasts are seen to be located in shallow depressions called resorption bays (Howship's lacunae). The resorption bays are created by the erosive action of osteoclasts on the underlying bone. The border of the lower part of an osteoclast exhibits finger-like processes due to the presence of deep infoldings of the cell membrane. This border is called the ruffled border. It lies in contact with the bone surface within a resorption bay. The periphery of the ruffled border is surrounded by a ring-like zone of cytoplasm, which is devoid of cell organelles but rich in actin filaments. This zone is called the clear zone or sealing zone. The actin filaments enable the cell membrane surrounding the sealing zone to be anchored firmly to the bony wall of Howship's lacunae. In this way, a closed subosteoclastic compartment is created between the ruffled border and the bone that is undergoing resorption. The osteoclasts secrete hydrogen ions, collagenase, cathepsin K and hydrolytic enzymes into this compartment.

Resorption of bone matrix by the osteoclasts involves two steps: (1) dissolution of inorganic components (minerals), and (2) digestion of organic component of the bone matrix. The osteoclasts pump hydrogen ions into the subosteoclastic compartment and thus create an acidic microenvironment, which increases solubility of bone mineral, resulting in the release and re-entry of bone minerals into the cytoplasm of osteoclasts to be delivered to nearby capillaries. After the removal of minerals, collagenase and gelatinase are secreted into the subosteoclastic compartment. These enzymes digest and degrade collagen and other organic components of decalcified bone matrix. The degradation products are phagocytosed by osteoclasts at the ruffled border. Because of their phagocytic properties, osteoclasts are considered to be a component of the mononuclear phagocyte system (MPS).

The activity of osteoclasts is controlled by hormones and cytokines. Calcitonin, a hormone of the thyroid gland, suppresses osteoclastic activity. Osteoclasts do not have receptors for parathyroid hormone (PTH). However, PTH stimulates osteoblasts to secrete a cytokine called osteoclast-stimulating factor, which is a potent stimulator of osteoclastic activity.

== Structure ==
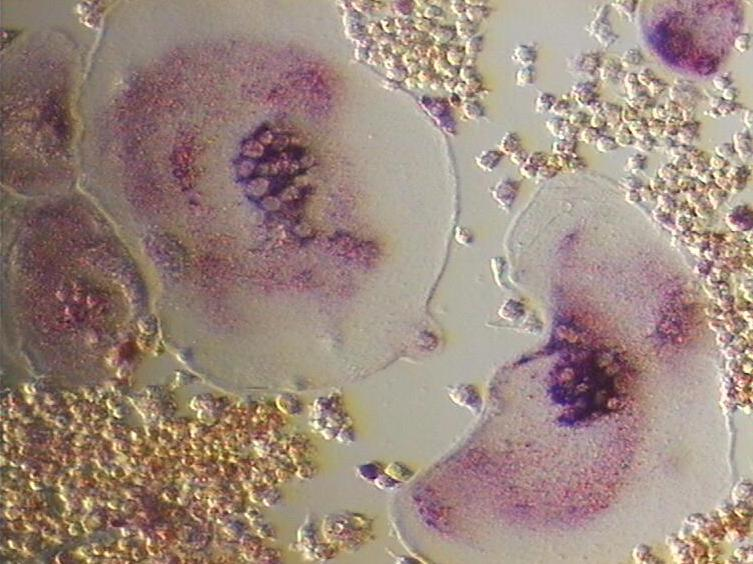
Tartrate resistant acid phosphatase positive osteoclast in cell culture

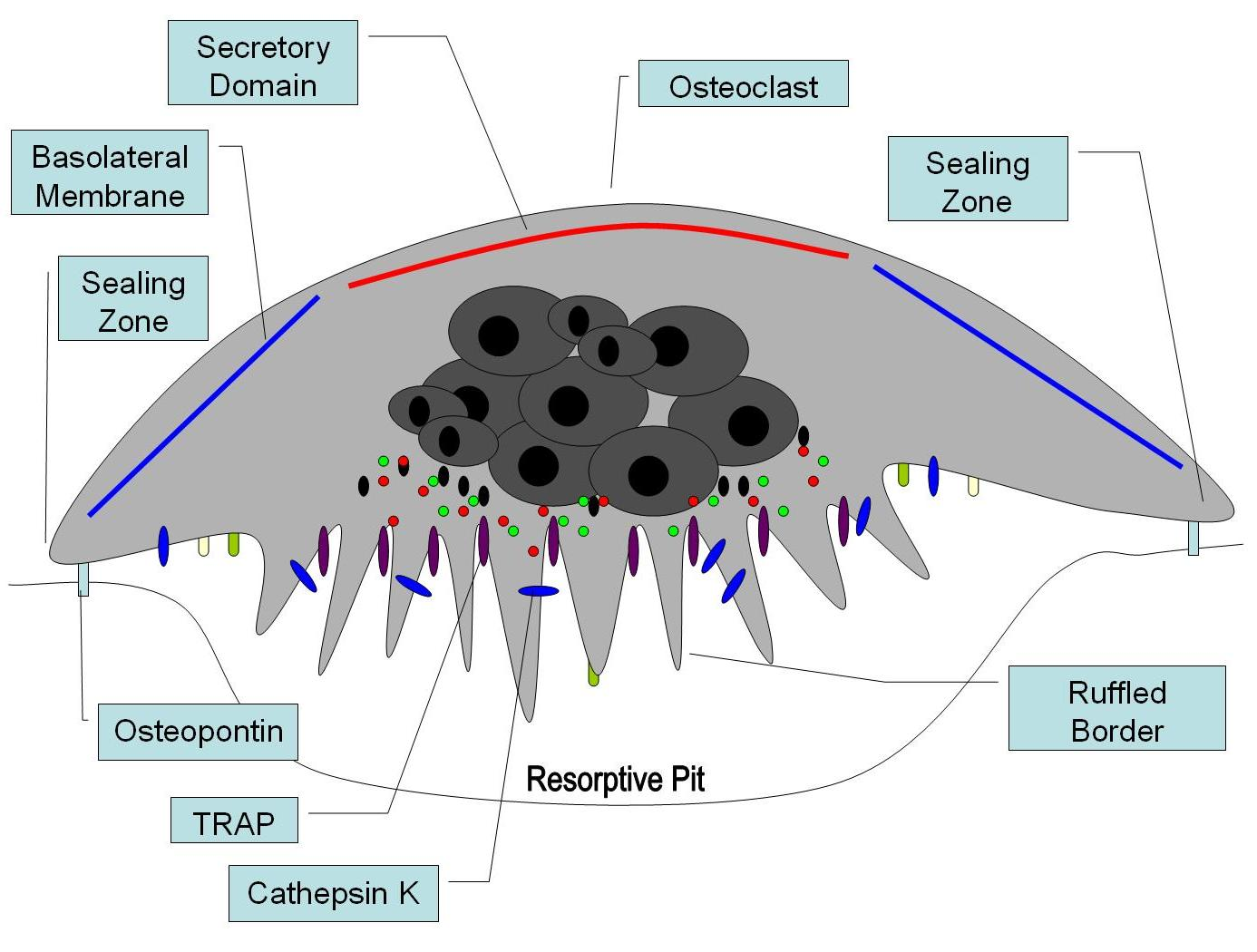
Illustrated cross-section of an activated osteoclast

An osteoclast is a large multinucleate cell and human osteoclasts on bone typically have four nuclei and are 150–200 μm in diameter. When osteoclast-inducing cytokines are used to convert macrophages to osteoclasts, very large cells that may reach 100 μm in diameter occur. These may have dozens of nuclei, and typically express major osteoclast proteins but have significant differences from cells in living bone because of the not-natural substrate. The size of the multinucleated assembled osteoclast allows it to focus the ion transport, protein secretory and vesicular transport capabilities of many macrophages on a localized area of bone.

=== Location ===
In bone, osteoclasts are found in pits in the bone surface which are called resorption bays, or Howship's lacunae. Osteoclasts are characterized by a cytoplasm with a homogeneous, "foamy" appearance. This appearance is due to a high concentration of vesicles and vacuoles. These vacuoles include lysosomes filled with acid phosphatase. This permits characterization of osteoclasts by their staining for high expression of tartrate resistant acid phosphatase (TRAP) and cathepsin K. Osteoclast rough endoplasmic reticulum is sparse, and the Golgi complex is extensive.

At a site of active bone resorption, the osteoclast forms a specialized cell membrane, the "ruffled border", that opposes the surface of the bone tissue. This extensively folded or ruffled border facilitates bone removal by dramatically increasing the cell surface for secretion and uptake of the resorption compartment contents and is a morphologic characteristic of an osteoclast that is actively resorbing bone.

== Development ==
Since their discovery in 1873 there has been considerable debate about their origin. Three theories were dominant: from 1949 to 1970 the connective tissue origin was popular, which stated that osteoclasts and osteoblasts are of the same lineage, and osteoblasts fuse together to form osteoclasts. After years of controversy it is now clear that these cells develop from the self fusion of macrophages. It was in the beginning of 1980 that the monocyte phagocytic system was recognized as precursor of osteoclasts. Osteoclast formation requires the presence of RANKL (receptor activator of nuclear factor κβ ligand) and M-CSF (Macrophage colony-stimulating factor). These membrane-bound proteins are produced by neighbouring stromal cells and osteoblasts, thus requiring direct contact between these cells and osteoclast precursors.

M-CSF acts through its receptor on the osteoclast, c-fms (colony-stimulating factor 1 receptor), a transmembrane tyrosine kinase-receptor, leading to secondary messenger activation of tyrosine kinase Src. Both of these molecules are necessary for osteoclastogenesis and are widely involved in the differentiation of monocyte/macrophage derived cells.

RANKL is a member of the tumour necrosis family (TNF), and is essential in osteoclastogenesis. RANKL knockout mice exhibit a phenotype of osteopetrosis and defects of tooth eruption, along with an absence or deficiency of osteoclasts. RANKL activates NF-κβ (nuclear factor-κβ) and NFATc1 (nuclear factor of activated t cells, cytoplasmic, calcineurin-dependent 1) through RANK. NF-κβ activation is stimulated almost immediately after RANKL-RANK interaction occurs and is not upregulated. NFATc1 stimulation, however, begins ~24–48 hours after binding occurs and its expression has been shown to be RANKL dependent.

Osteoclast differentiation is inhibited by osteoprotegerin (OPG), which is produced by osteoblasts and binds to RANKL thereby preventing interaction with RANK. While osteoclasts are derived from the hematopoietic lineage, osteoblasts are derived from mesenchymal stem cells.

== Function ==
Once activated, osteoclasts move to areas of microfracture in the bone by chemotaxis. Osteoclasts lie in small cavities called Howship's lacunae, formed from the digestion of the underlying bone. The sealing zone is the attachment of the osteoclast's plasma membrane to the underlying bone. Sealing zones are bounded by belts of specialized adhesion structures called podosomes. Attachment to the bone matrix is facilitated by integrin receptors, such as αvβ3, via the specific amino acid motif Arg-Gly-Asp in bone matrix proteins, such as osteopontin. The osteoclast releases hydrogen ions through the action of carbonic anhydrase (H_{2}O + CO_{2} → HCO_{3}^{−} + H^{+}) through the ruffled border into the resorptive cavity, acidifying and aiding dissolution of the mineralized bone matrix into Ca^{2+}, H_{3}PO_{4}, H_{2}CO_{3}, water and other substances. Dysfunction of the carbonic anhydrase has been documented to cause some forms of osteopetrosis. Hydrogen ions are pumped against a high concentration gradient by proton pumps, specifically a unique vacuolar-ATPase. This enzyme has been targeted in the prevention of osteoporosis. In addition, several hydrolytic enzymes, such as members of the cathepsin and matrix metalloprotease (MMP) groups, are released to digest the organic components of the matrix. These enzymes are released into the compartment by lysosomes. Of these hydrolytic enzymes, cathepsin K is of most importance.

=== Cathepsin K and other cathepsins ===
Cathepsin K is a collagenolytic papain-like cysteine protease that is mainly expressed in osteoclasts, and is secreted into the resorptive pit. Cathepsin K is the major protease involved in the degradation of type I collagen and other noncollagenous proteins. Mutations in the cathepsin K gene are associated with pycnodysostosis, a hereditary osteopetrotic disease, characterised by a lack of functional cathepsin K expression. Knockout studies of cathepsin K in mice lead to an osteopetrotic phenotype, which, is partially compensated by increased expression of proteases other that cathepsin K and enhanced osteoclastogenesis.

Cathepsin K has an optimal enzymatic activity in acidic conditions. It is synthesized as a proenzyme with a molecular weight of 37kDa, and upon activation by autocatalytic cleavage, is transformed into the mature, active form with a molecular weight of ~27kDa.

Upon polarization of the osteoclast over the site of resorption, cathepsin K is secreted from the ruffled border into the resorptive pit. Cathepsin K transmigrates across the ruffled border by intercellular vesicles and is then released by the functional secretory domain. Within these intercellular vesicles, cathepsin K, along with reactive oxygen species generated by TRAP, further degrades the bone extracellular matrix.

Several other cathepsins are expressed in osteoclasts including cathepsins B, C, D, E, G, and L. The function of these cysteine and aspartic proteases is generally unknown within bone, and they are expressed at much lower levels than cathepsin K.

Studies on cathepsin L knockout mice have been mixed, with a report of reduced trabecular bone in homozygous and heterozygous cathepsin L knockout mice compared to wild-type and another report finding no skeletal abnormalities.

=== Matrix metalloproteinases ===
The matrix metalloproteinases (MMPs) comprise a family of more than 20 zinc-dependent endopeptidases. The role of matrix metalloproteinases (MMPs) in osteoclast biology is ill-defined, but in other tissue they have been linked with tumor promoting activities, such as activation of growth factors and are required for tumor metastasis and angiogenesis.

MMP9 is associated with the bone microenvironment. It is expressed by osteoclasts, and is known to be required for osteoclast migration and is a powerful gelatinase. Transgenic mice lacking MMP-9 develop defects in bone development, intraosseous angiogenesis, and fracture repair.

MMP-13 is believed to be involved in bone resorption and in osteoclast differentiation, as knockout mice revealed decreased osteoclast numbers, osteopetrosis, and decreased bone resorption.

MMPs expressed by the osteoclast include MMP-9, -10, -12, and -14. apart from MMP-9, little is known about their relevance to the osteoclast, however, high levels of MMP-14 are found at the sealing zone.

=== Osteoclast physiology ===
In the 1980s and 90s the physiology of typical osteoclasts was studied in detail. With the isolation of the ruffled border, ion transport across it was studied directly in biochemical detail. Energy-dependent acid transport was verified and the postulated proton pump purified. With the successful culture of osteoclasts, it became apparent that they are organized to support the massive transport of protons for acidification of the resorption compartment and solubilization of the bone mineral. This includes ruffled border Cl^{−} permeability to control membrane potential and basolateral Cl^{−}/HCO_{3}^{−} exchange to maintain cytosolic pH in physiologically acceptable ranges.

The effectiveness of its ion secretion depends upon the osteoclast forming an effective seal around the resorption compartment. The positioning of this "sealing zone" appears to be mediated by integrins expressed on the osteoclast surface. With the sealing zone in place, the multinucleated osteoclast reorganizes itself. Developing the highly invaginated ruffled membrane apposing the resorption compartment allows massive secretory activity. In addition, it permits the vesicular transcytosis of the mineral and degraded collagen from the ruffled border to the free membrane of the cell, and its release into the extracellular compartment. This activity completes the bone resorption, and both the mineral components and collagen fragments are released to the general circulation.

=== Regulation ===
Osteoclasts are regulated by several hormones, including parathyroid hormone (PTH) from the parathyroid gland, calcitonin from the thyroid gland, and growth factor interleukin 6 (IL-6). This last hormone, IL-6, is one of the factors in the disease osteoporosis. Osteoporosis occurs when there is an imbalance between the bone resorption activities of osteoclasts and the bone formation activities of osteoblasts.

Osteoclast activity is also mediated by the interaction of two molecules produced by osteoblasts, namely osteoprotegerin and RANK ligand. These molecules also regulate differentiation of the osteoclast.

== Alternate use of term ==
An osteoclast can also be an instrument used to fracture and reset bones (the origin is Greek osteon: bone and klastos: broken). To avoid confusion, the cell was originally termed osotoclast. When the surgical instrument went out of use, the cell became known by its present name.

== Clinical significance ==
Giant osteoclasts can occur in some diseases, including Paget's disease of bone and bisphosphonate toxicity.

In cats, abnormal odontoclast activity can cause feline odontoclastic resorptive lesions, necessitating extraction of the affected teeth.

Osteoclasts play a major role in orthodontic tooth movement and pathologic migration of periodontally compromised teeth.

== History ==
Osteoclasts were discovered by Kölliker in 1873.

== See also ==
- List of human cell types derived from the germ layers
- List of distinct cell types in the adult human body
