= Medivir =

Swedish biotechnology company

Medivir AB
- Type: Public limited company
- Traded as: Nasdaq Stockholm: MVIR B
- Industry: Biotechnology
- Founded: 1988; 38 years ago
- Headquarters: Huddinge, Sweden
- Area served: Global
- Key people: Jens Lindberg (CEO)
- Products: Oncological R&D
- Revenue: 658 MM SEK (2015)
- Number of employees: 15
- Website: www.medivir.com

Medivir is a Swedish biotech company. Medivir focuses its research focus on oncology and particularly on innovative pharmaceuticals that meet substantial unmet medical needs. The pharmaceutical development work is conducted both in-house and through partnerships, usually with global pharmaceutical companies. Medivir has a leading expertise in the design of protease inhibitors and in the science of nucleotides and nucleosides. Medivir is listed on the Nasdaq Stockholm Mid Cap List.

In February 2020, Medivir announced that the company has signed a licensing agreement for Xerclear with Chinese company Shijiazhuang Yuanmai Biotechnology Co Ltd (SYB). The agreement gives SYB the right to register, manufacture and market the product in China.

== Oncology ==
In 2016 Medivir announced that it would focus its research on cancers of high unmet medical need, where existing therapies are not very successful and there is a great opportunity to provide real benefit to patients who have few treatment options. Some cancer types of particular interest to Medivir include hepatocellular carcinoma (HCC), glioblastoma multiforme (GBM) and pancreatic cancer, which are all highly aggressive diseases with poor treatment options and very low overall survival rates on the best current treatments today. HCC is a liver cancer derived from hepatocyte cells. HCC is one of the most common cancers worldwide and late stage HCC has a mean overall survival of only 9–11 months on the best available treatment today. Medivir motivated the transition from its origin in retroviral drugs to oncology by it being a logical extension of their expertise in liver disease from earlier work on hepatitis C to this area.

== Notable ongoing projects ==
- Remetinostat, HDAC inhibitor for Cutaneous T cell lymphoma.
- Birinapant, SMAC mimetic for solid tumours.
- Miv-711 Cathepsin K inhibitor for osteoarthritis.

== See also ==
- Fast track (FDA)
- MALT1
