= RANK =

Mammalian protein found in Homo sapiens

TNFRSF11A
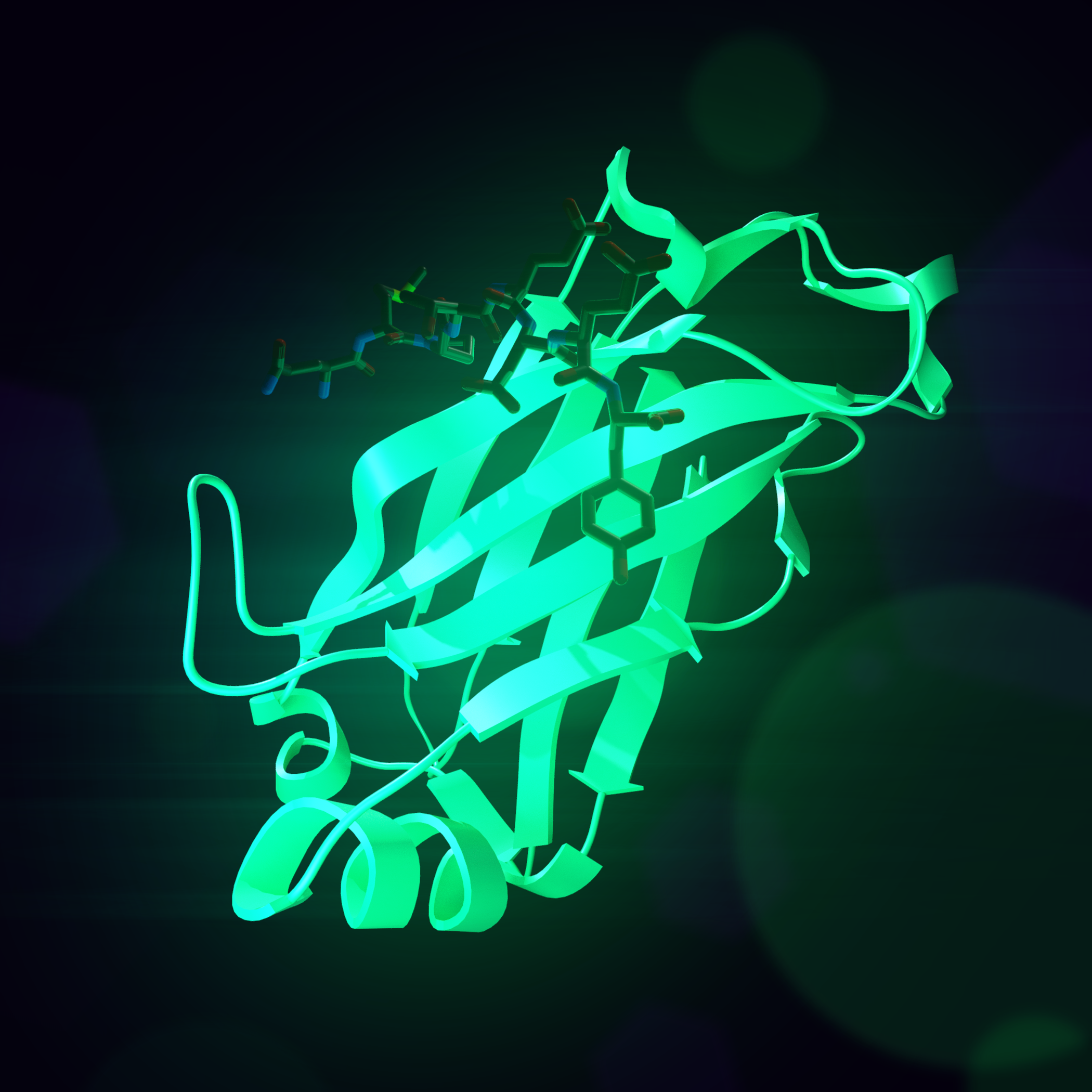

Identifiers
- Aliases: TNFRSF11A, tumor necrosis factor receptor superfamily, member 11a, NFKB activator, CD265, FEO, LOH18CR1, ODFR, OFE, OPTB7, OSTS, PDB2, RANK, TRANCER, tumor necrosis factor receptor superfamily member 11a, TNF receptor superfamily member 11a, TRANCE-R
- External IDs: OMIM: 603499; MGI: 1314891; GeneCards: TNFRSF11A
Available structures
PDB	Ortholog search: PDBe RCSB
PDB	List of PDB id codes 1LB5

Gene location (Human)
Chr.	Chromosome 18 (human)
Band	18q21.33	Start	62,325,287 bp
Band	18q21.33	End	62,391,288 bp

Gene location (Mouse)
Chr.	Chromosome 1 (mouse)
Band	1|1 E2.1	Start	105,708,443 bp
Band	1|1 E2.1	End	105,775,709 bp
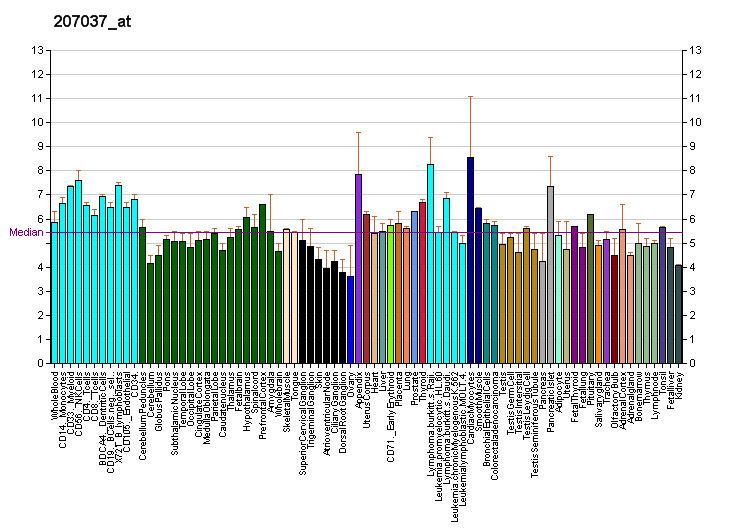
RNA expression pattern
Bgee	Human / Mouse (ortholog); Top expressed in: parotid gland; mucosa of sigmoid colon; jejunal mucosa; rectum; duodenum; mucosa of ileum; mucosa of transverse colon; pancreatic ductal cell; gallbladder; epithelium of colon / Top expressed in: left colon; duodenum; submandibular gland; ileum; lumbar spinal ganglion; jejunum; right kidney; Paneth cell; stroma of bone marrow; embryo; More reference expression data
BioGPS	More reference expression data
Gene ontology
Molecular function	metal ion binding; protein binding; tumor necrosis factor-activated receptor activity; transmembrane signaling receptor activity; cytokine binding; signaling receptor activity
Cellular component	integral component of membrane; membrane; integral component of plasma membrane; cell surface; external side of plasma membrane; cytosol; plasma membrane
Biological process	regulation of apoptotic process; response to cytokine; response to interleukin-1; adaptive immune response; ossification; monocyte chemotaxis; circadian temperature homeostasis; positive regulation of JUN kinase activity; osteoclast differentiation; cell-cell signaling; positive regulation of DNA-binding transcription factor activity; tumor necrosis factor-mediated signaling pathway; mammary gland alveolus development; multicellular organism development; response to tumor necrosis factor; response to lipopolysaccharide; positive regulation of NF-kappaB transcription factor activity; positive regulation of fever generation by positive regulation of prostaglandin secretion; positive regulation of ERK1 and ERK2 cascade via TNFSF11-mediated signaling; positive regulation of cell population proliferation; apoptotic signaling pathway; response to radiation; TNFSF11-mediated signaling pathway; inflammatory response; lymph node development; signal transduction; positive regulation of bone resorption; multinuclear osteoclast differentiation
Sources:Amigo / QuickGO
Orthologs
Databases	NCBI: entry; OMA: entry
Species	Human	Mouse
Entrez	8792	21934
Ensembl	ENSG00000141655	ENSMUSG00000026321
UniProt	Q9Y6Q6	O35305
RefSeq (mRNA)	NM_001270949; NM_001270950; NM_001270951; NM_001278268; NM_003839	NM_009399
RefSeq (protein)	NP_001257878; NP_001257879; NP_001257880; NP_001265197; NP_003830	NP_033425
Location (UCSC)	Chr 18: 62.33 – 62.39 Mb	Chr 1: 105.71 – 105.78 Mb
PubMed search
- Wikidata
View/Edit Human	View/Edit Mouse

Receptor activator of nuclear factor κ B (RANK), also known as TRANCE receptor or TNFRSF11A, is a member of the tumor necrosis factor receptor (TNFR) molecular sub-family. RANK is the receptor for RANK-Ligand (RANKL) and part of the RANK/RANKL/OPG signaling pathway that regulates osteoclast differentiation and activation. It is associated with bone remodeling and repair, immune cell function, lymph node development, thermal regulation, and mammary gland development. Osteoprotegerin (OPG) is a decoy receptor for RANKL, and regulates the stimulation of the RANK signaling pathway by competing for RANKL. The cytoplasmic domain of RANK binds TRAFs 1, 2, 3, 5, and 6 which transmit signals to downstream targets such as NF-κB and JNK.

RANK is constitutively expressed in skeletal muscle, thymus, liver, colon, small intestine, adrenal gland, osteoclast, mammary gland epithelial cells, prostate, vascular cell, and pancreas. Most commonly, activation of NF-κB is mediated by RANKL, but over-expression of RANK alone is sufficient to activate the NF-κB pathway.

RANKL (receptor activator for nuclear factor κ B ligand) is found on the surface of stromal cells, osteoblasts, and T cells. Mutations affecting RANK have been associated with infantile malignant osteopetrosis in humans, mice and cats.

== Structure ==
RANK is a 616 amino acid type I transmembrane protein. Its extracellular domain consists of 184 amino acids, its transmembrane domain has 21 amino acids, and its cytoplasmic domain consists of 383 amino acids. Like other members of the TNFR family, it has four extracellular cysteine-rich pseudo-repeat domains (CRDs). It shares 40% amino acid identity with CD40. RANK is encoded on human chromosome 18q22.1. It shows 85% homology between mouse and human homologues.

There are two monomers of RANK related by noncrystallographic 2-fold symmetry perpendicular to the long axis of the molecules in the asymmetric unit. RANK contains four CRDs spanning a length of 100 Angstroms which makes it the longest member of the TNFR family to date.

The binding of RANKL to RANK trimerizes the receptor and activates a signaling pathway. The RANK-RANKL complex forms a heterohexameric complex. Only two of the four RANK CRDs are in direct contact with the RANKL. The majority of the complex's residues are hydrophilic. Unlike other members of the TNFSF, each surface interaction in RANK-RANKL is continuous.

== Function ==
=== Osteoclastogenesis ===
TRAF6 has been shown to be imperative to the RANK-related osteoclastogenesis pathway. RANKL binds to RANK, which then binds to TRAF6. TRAF6 stimulates the activation of the c-jun N-terminal kinase (JNK) and nuclear factor kappa-b (NF-κB) pathways which trigger differentiation and activation of osteoclasts. This system is balanced by the relative expression of OPG to RANKL, which are highly regulated by many factors including hormones, immune signals, and growth factors. An overexpression of RANKL can cause an overproduction and activation of osteoclasts, which break down bone. The balance between RANKL and OPG is a target for therapy in many diseases including estrogen deficiency-associated osteoporosis, rheumatoid arthritis, Paget's disease, periodontal disease, and bone tumors and malignancies.

=== Thermoregulation ===
RANK has also been shown to be a key in the thermoregulation signaling in females, which seems to be regulated by ovarian sex hormones. RANK is expressed in key regions of the brain associated with thermoregulation. Inactivation of RANK in these regions causes a loss of fever response to increased levels of RANKL. It has also been shown to be a critical mediator of fever response to lipopolysaccharide-induced fever and pro-inflammatory cytokines IL-1B and TNFa. This key role of the RANK-RANKL system may link the osteoporosis and hot flashes seen as symptoms of hormonal changes in post-menopausal women.

=== Mammary gland development ===
RANK is constitutively expressed in mammary epithelial tissues. Calcium transferred from mother to fetus and neonate is provided by the degradation of the female bone by increased osteoclastic activity, which is regulated by the RANK/RANKL axis. RANKL also works through RANK to provide proliferative and survival signals to promote the final stages of lactating mammary gland development. Dysfunctional RANK or RANKL causes the arrest of differentiation and expansion of the alveolar bunds into mature lobulo-alveolar mammary structures, disabling the production of milk.

== Clinical significance ==
=== Cancer ===
RANK and RANKL have been reported to be expressed in some breast cancer and prostate cancer cell lines. RANKL expression in infiltrating T cells within mammary carcinomas activate RANK-expressing neoplastic mammary epithelial cells which stimulate metastasis. The expression of RANKL in these cells and the expression of RANK in bone cells may be the biological presentation of Paget's seed and soil idea. The affinity for RANK of RANKL may be the reason these cancers tend to metastasize to bone. Once the tumor is seeded in the bone, the tumor cells stimulate bone resorption by secreting factors such as RANKL or prompting the surrounding stroma to express growth factors. These growth factors then upregulate production of RANKL which leads to osteoclastogenesis and bone destruction. The destruction of bone releases more growth factors and RANKL which induces more osteoclastogenesis, triggering a vicious cycle of bone destruction that is seen in metastatic bone tumors.

=== Targeted therapies ===
Most therapies that target the RANK/RANKL/OPG axis aim to either down-regulate expression of RANKL or upregulate the expression of the decoy receptor OPG. For example, denosumab is a fully human monoclonal antibody that is directed against RANKL. In phase I and II trials, denosumab led to a decrease in bone resorption in multiple myeloma, prostate cancer and breast cancer patients. Another study looked into developing small mimetics based on the structure of OPG that bind to RANK as well as RANKL and cause defective coupling between the two.

== Interactions ==
RANK has been shown to interact with:

- TRAF1,
- TRAF2,
- TRAF3,
- TRAF5, and
- TRAF6.

== See also ==
- RANKL
- Osteoprotegerin
- Osteoimmunology
