= Feline odontoclastic resorptive lesion =

Oral disease of cats

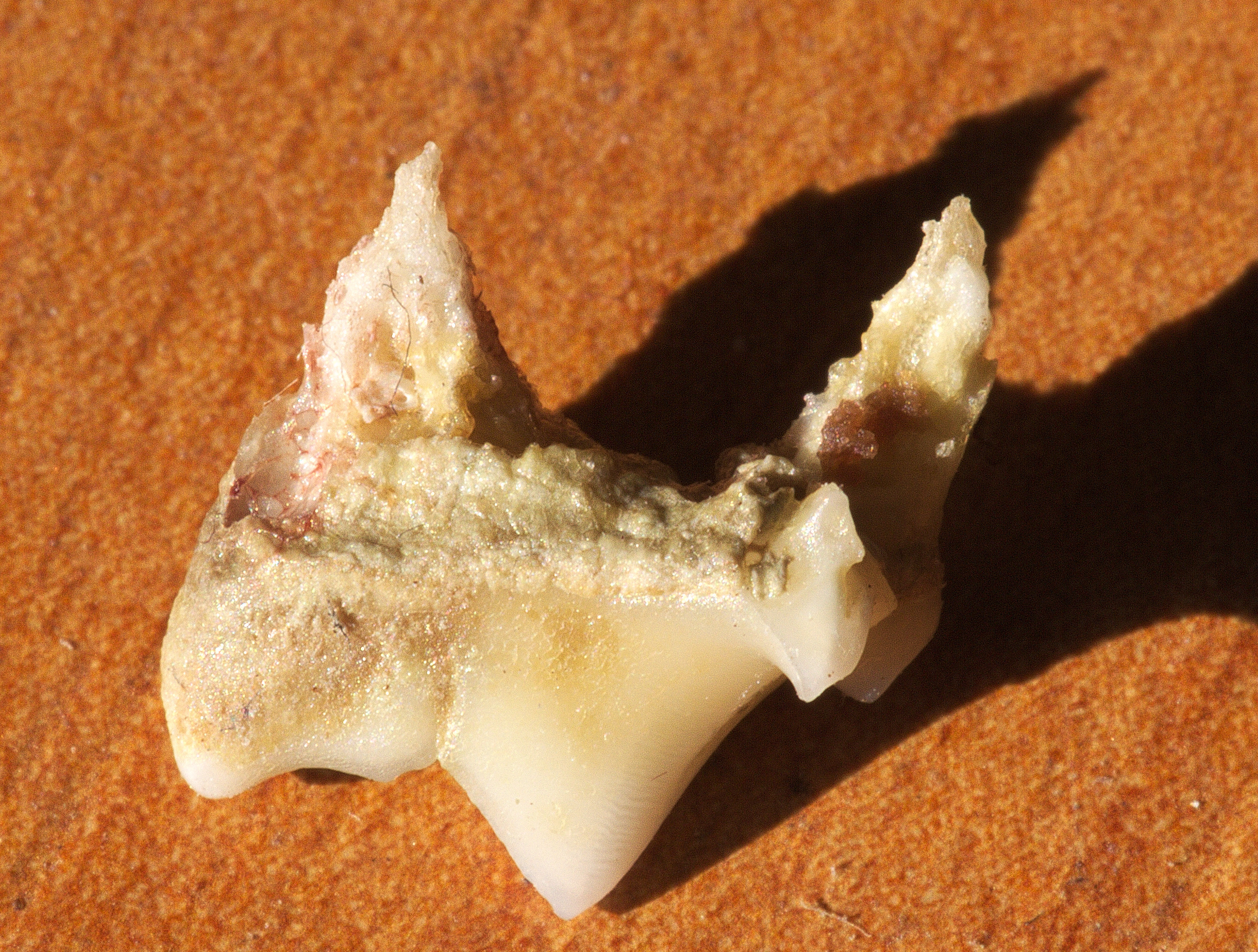
Feline odontoclastic resorptive lesions on a molar.

Feline odontoclastic resorption lesion (FORL) is a syndrome in cats characterized by resorption of the tooth by odontoclasts, cells similar to osteoclasts. FORL has also been called Feline tooth resorption (TR), neck lesion, cervical neck lesion, cervical line erosion, feline subgingival resorptive lesion, feline caries, or feline cavity. It is one of the most common diseases of domestic cats, affecting up to two-thirds. FORLs have been seen more recently in the history of feline medicine due to the advancing ages of cats, but 800-year-old cat skeletons have shown evidence of this disease. Purebred cats, especially Siamese and Persians, may be more susceptible.

Dental anatomy

FORLs clinically appear as erosions of the surface of the tooth at the gingival border. They are often covered with calculus or gingival tissue. It is a progressive disease, usually starting with loss of cementum and dentin and leading to penetration of the pulp cavity. Resorption continues up the dentinal tubules into the tooth crown. The enamel is also resorbed or undermined to the point of tooth fracture. Resorbed cementum and dentin is replaced with bone-like tissue.

== Clinical signs ==
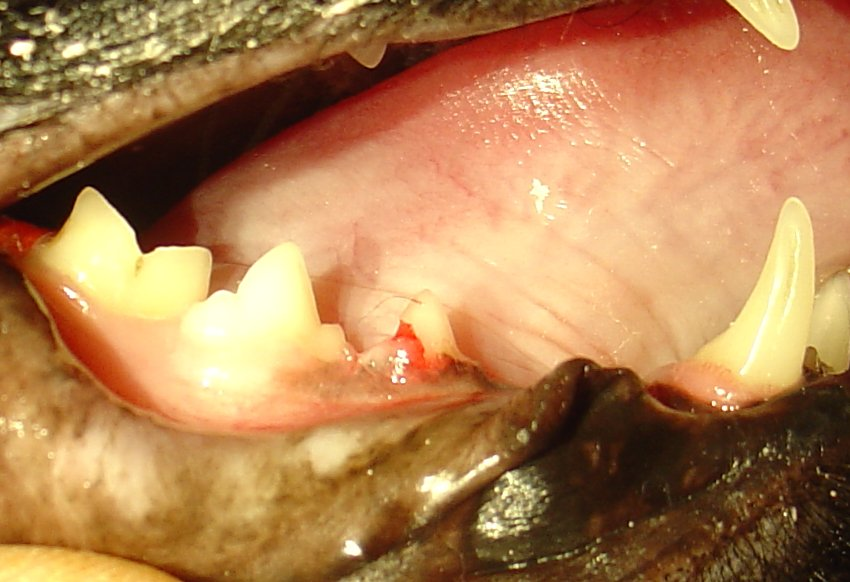
FORL of the lower third premolar

Clinical signs of FORLs are often minimal since the discomfort can be minor. However, there may be subtle signs of discomfort while chewing, as well as anorexia, dehydration, weight loss, and tooth fracture. The lower third premolar is the most commonly affected tooth.

== Cause ==
There are two types of FORL. "Type 1" lesions are focal defects often caused by local inflammation. "Type 2" lesions are characterized by a generalized loss of root radiopacity on a dental radiograph. The definitive cause of type 2 FORLs is unknown, but histologically destruction of the cementum and other mineralized tissue of the tooth root by odontoclasts is seen. It occurs secondary to the loss of the protective covering of the root (the periodontal ligaments) and possibly to a stimulus such as periodontal disease and the release of cytokines, leading to odontoclast migration. However, FORLs can develop in the absence of inflammation. The natural inhibition to root resorption provided by the lining of the root may be altered by increased amounts of Vitamin D, in cats supplied by their diet.

=== Risk factors ===
Certain breeds are overrepresented, namely: Persian, Scottish Fold, Abyssinian, Siamese, and Russian Blue. Other risk factors include: cats that do not chew their food, being fed human leftovers/food, older age, female sex, tap water, raw liver, lack of calcium, and cats without outdoor access.

== Treatment ==
Treatment for FORLs is limited to tooth extraction because the lesion is progressive. Amputation of the tooth crown without root removal has also been advocated in cases demonstrated on a radiograph to be type 2 resorption without associated periodontal or endodontic disease because the roots are being replaced by bone. However, X-rays are recommended prior to this treatment to document root resorption and lack of the periodontal ligament.

Tooth restoration is not recommended because resorption of the tooth will continue underneath the restoration. Use of alendronate has been studied to decrease progression of existing lesions.

== Differential diagnosis: dental caries ==
True dental caries are uncommon among companion animals. Although it has not been accurately documented in cats, the incidence of caries in dogs has been estimated at 5%. The term feline cavities is commonly used to refer to FORLs; however, saccharolytic acid-producing bacteria are not involved in this condition.
