= RANKL =

Mammalian protein found in Homo sapiens

TNFSF11
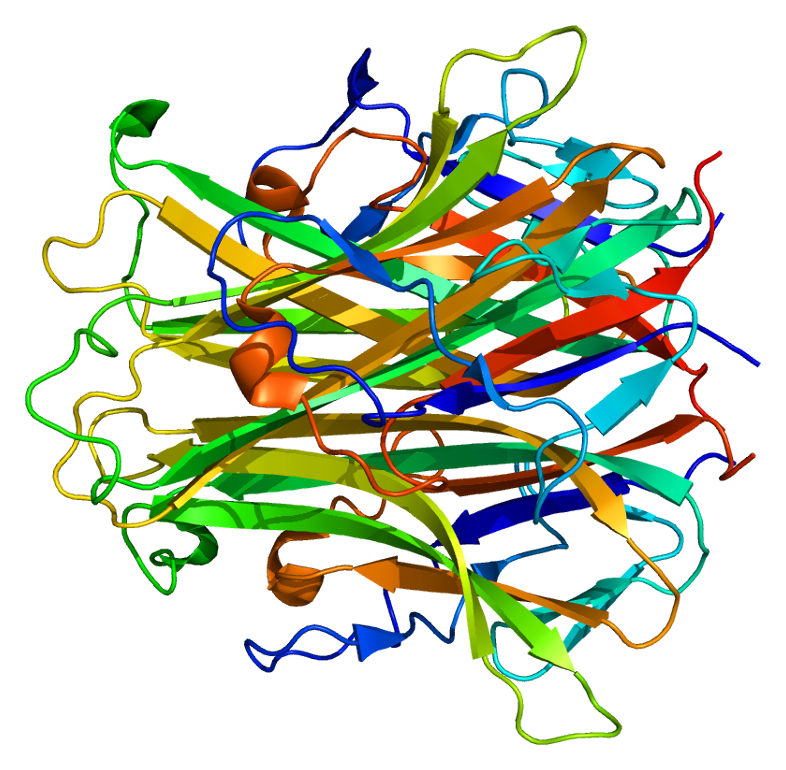

Identifiers
- Aliases: TNFSF11, CD254, ODF, OPGL, OPTB2, RANKL, TRANCE, hRANKL2, sOdf, TNLG6B, tumor necrosis factor superfamily member 11, TNF superfamily member 11
- External IDs: OMIM: 602642; MGI: 1100089; GeneCards: TNFSF11
Available structures
PDB	Ortholog search: PDBe RCSB
PDB	List of PDB id codes 3URF, 5BNQ

Gene location (Human)
Chr.	Chromosome 13 (human)
Band	13q14.11	Start	42,562,736 bp
Band	13q14.11	End	42,608,013 bp

Gene location (Mouse)
Chr.	Chromosome 14 (mouse)
Band	14 D3|14 41.26 cM	Start	78,514,885 bp
Band	14 D3|14 41.26 cM	End	78,545,483 bp
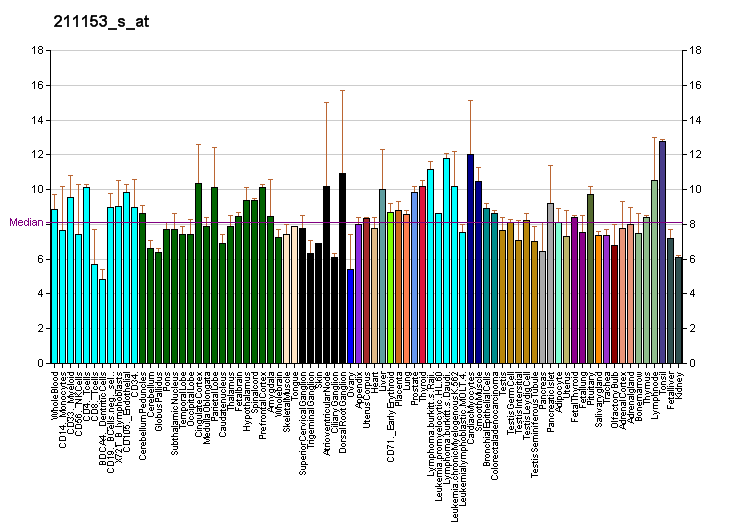

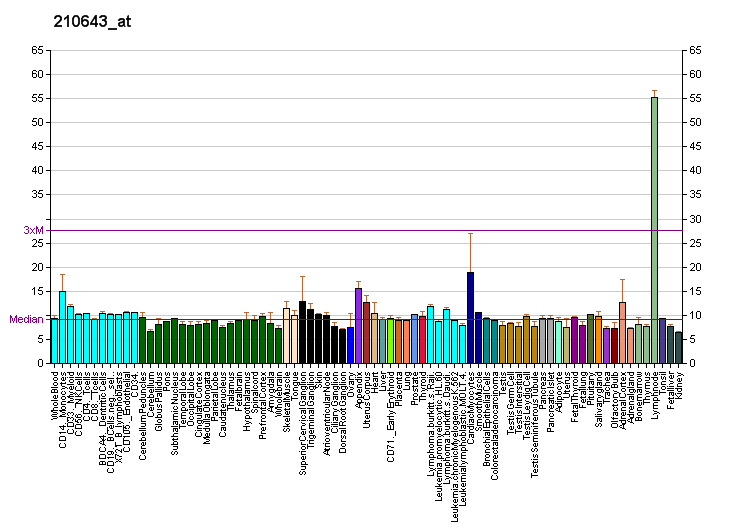
RNA expression pattern
Bgee	Human / Mouse (ortholog); Top expressed in: gonad; tibia; lymph node; buccal mucosa cell; palpebral conjunctiva; testicle; appendix; amniotic fluid; epithelium of nasopharynx; rectum / Top expressed in: urethra; female urethra; male urethra; mesenteric lymph nodes; secondary oocyte; primary oocyte; embryo; lactiferous gland; endothelial cell of lymphatic vessel; embryo; More reference expression data
BioGPS	More reference expression data
Gene ontology
Molecular function	cytokine activity; tumor necrosis factor receptor superfamily binding; tumor necrosis factor receptor binding; protein binding
Cellular component	cytoplasm; integral component of membrane; membrane; plasma membrane; integral component of plasma membrane; extracellular region; extracellular space
Biological process	mammary gland epithelial cell proliferation; cell differentiation; positive regulation of protein kinase B signaling; positive regulation of corticotropin-releasing hormone secretion; positive regulation of MAP kinase activity; calcium ion homeostasis; ossification; monocyte chemotaxis; cytokine-mediated signaling pathway; osteoclast differentiation; ERK1 and ERK2 cascade; paracrine signaling; positive regulation of DNA-binding transcription factor activity; positive regulation of osteoclast differentiation; tumor necrosis factor-mediated signaling pathway; positive regulation of intracellular signal transduction; positive regulation of bone resorption; mammary gland alveolus development; positive regulation of JNK cascade; bone resorption; positive regulation of osteoclast development; multicellular organism development; positive regulation of T cell activation; positive regulation of homotypic cell-cell adhesion; positive regulation of NF-kappaB transcription factor activity; positive regulation of fever generation by positive regulation of prostaglandin secretion; positive regulation of ERK1 and ERK2 cascade via TNFSF11-mediated signaling; regulation of osteoclast differentiation; immune response; animal organ morphogenesis; positive regulation of I-kappaB kinase/NF-kappaB signaling; TNFSF11-mediated signaling pathway; positive regulation of phosphorylation; protein homooligomerization; positive regulation of transcription by RNA polymerase II; osteoclast proliferation; calcium-mediated signaling; cellular response to leukemia inhibitory factor; regulation of signaling receptor activity; tooth eruption; bone development; positive regulation of gene expression; osteoclast development; regulation of actin binding
Sources:Amigo / QuickGO
Orthologs
Databases	NCBI: entry; OMA: entry
Species	Human	Mouse
Entrez	8600	21943
Ensembl	ENSG00000120659	ENSMUSG00000022015
UniProt	O14788	O35235
RefSeq (mRNA)	NM_003701; NM_033012	NM_011613
RefSeq (protein)	NP_003692; NP_143026	NP_035743
Location (UCSC)	Chr 13: 42.56 – 42.61 Mb	Chr 14: 78.51 – 78.55 Mb
PubMed search
- Wikidata
View/Edit Human	View/Edit Mouse

Receptor activator of nuclear factor kappa-Β ligand (RANKL), also known as tumor necrosis factor ligand superfamily member 11 (TNFSF11), TNF-related activation-induced cytokine (TRANCE), osteoprotegerin ligand (OPGL), and osteoclast differentiation factor (ODF), is a protein that in humans is encoded by the TNFSF11 gene.

RANKL is known as a type II membrane protein and is a member of the tumor necrosis factor (TNF) superfamily. RANKL has been identified to affect the immune system and control bone regeneration and remodeling. RANKL is an apoptosis regulator gene, a binding partner of osteoprotegerin (OPG), a ligand for the receptor RANK and controls cell proliferation by modifying protein levels of Id4, Id2 and cyclin D1. RANKL is expressed in several tissues and organs including: skeletal muscle, thymus, liver, colon, small intestine, adrenal gland, osteoblast, mammary gland epithelial cells, prostate and pancreas. Variation in concentration levels of RANKL throughout several organs reconfirms the importance of RANKL in tissue growth (particularly bone growth) and immune functions within the body.

== Tissue expression ==
The level of RANKL expression does not linearly correlate to the effect of this ligand. High protein expression of RANKL is commonly detected in the lungs, thymus and lymph nodes. Low protein expression is found in bone marrow, the stomach, peripheral blood, the spleen, the placenta, leukocytes, the heart, the thyroid, and skeletal muscle. While bone marrow expresses low levels of RANKL, RANKL plays a critical role for adequate bone metabolism. This surface-bound molecule (also known as CD254), found on osteoblasts, serves to activate osteoclasts, which are critically involved in bone resorption. Osteoclastic activity is triggered via the osteoblasts' surface-bound RANKL activating the osteoclasts' surface-bound receptor activator of nuclear factor kappa-B (RANK). Recent studies suggest that in postnatal bones, the osteocyte is the major source of RANKL regulating bone remodeling. RANKL derived from other cell types contributes to bone loss in conditions involving inflammation such as rheumatoid arthritis, and in lytic lesions caused by cancer, such as in multiple myeloma.

== Gene and expression ==
RANKL can be expressed in three different molecular forms consisting of either a: (1) trimeric transmembrane protein, (2) primary secreted form, and (3) truncated ectodomain. RANKL is identified as a part of the TNF family; RANKL is specifically categorized under the TNFSF11, the TNF ligand superfamily member. RANKL is composed of 314 amino acids and was originally described to have a gene sequence containing 5 exons. Among the exons, Exon 1 encoded the intracellular and transmembrane protein domains and Exon 2-5 encoded the extracellular domains. RANKL's extracellular domains are similar to other TNF family members in regards to the structural homology and are able to cleave from the cell surface. While the function and significance of A kinase anchor protein 11(AKAP11) is presently unknown, AKAP11 is immediately upstream from RANKL for all species that has a RANKL gene. The upstream of AKAP11 may suggest there is a complex regulator process that regulates the level of RANKL expression.

== Function ==
RANKL is a member of the tumor necrosis factor (TNF) cytokine family. It binds to RANK on cells of the myeloid lineage and functions as a key factor for osteoclast differentiation and activation. RANKL may also bind to osteoprotegerin, a protein secreted mainly by cells of the osteoblast lineage which is a potent inhibitor of osteoclast formation by preventing binding of RANKL to RANK. RANKL also has a function in the immune system, where it is expressed by T helper cells and is thought to be involved in dendritic cell maturation. It is a dendritic cell survival factor and helps regulate T cell-dependent immune responses. T cell activation induces RANKL expression and can lead to an increase of osteoclastogenesis and bone loss. RANKL can also activate the antiapoptotic kinase AKT/PKB through a signaling complex involving SRC kinase and tumor necrosis factor receptor-associated factor 6 (TRAF6), indicating that RANKL may have a role in the regulation of apoptosis. A further role for RANKL in immunity was found in sinusoidal macrophages in lymph nodes that alert the immune system to lymph-borne antigens. In addition to directly signaling through RANK for macrophage differentiation, RANKL activates the adjacent lymphatic endothelial cells to create a niche environment for these specialized immune cells.

== Animal models ==
Targeted disruption of the related gene in mice led to severe osteopetrosis and a lack of osteoclasts. Deficient mice, with an inactivation of RANKL or its receptor RANK, exhibited defects in early differentiation of T and B lymphocytes, and failed to form lobulo-alveolar mammary structures during pregnancy. It was observed that during pregnancy, RANK-RANKL signaling played a critical role in regulating skeletal calcium release; in which contributed to the hormone response that stimulated proliferation in the mammary cells. Ultimately, impaired lobuloalveolar mammary structures resulted in death of the fetus. Those who suffer from osteoporosis often have a cardiovascular defect, such as heart failure. Some studies suggest, since RANK-RANKL pathway regulates calcium release and homeostasis, RANK-RANKL signal could invertedly affect the cardiovascular system; thus, an explanation for the positive correlation between osteoporosis and cardiovascular deficiencies.

== Role in cancer ==
Primary tumors commonly metastasize to bone. Breast and prostate cancers typically have the greatest likelihood of inducing secondary cancers within bone. Stephen Paget's seed and soil theory suggests that the microenvironment in bone creates a sufficient 'soil' for secondary tumors to grow in. Some studies suggest that the expression of RANKL allows sufficient microenvironmental conditions to influence cancer cell migration (e.g., in chronic lymphocytic leukemia (CLL) and multiple myeloma). Among patients with multiple myeloma, RANKL activity was greatly increased. In fact, RANKL surface expression and secreted RANKL expression were reported to be increased, 80% and 50%, respectively. Therefore, RANKL is considered to be a key signal regulator for cancer-induced bone loss.

After secondary tumor cells have migrated to the bone, they secrete cytokines and growth factors that act on osteoblast lineage cells. Since osteoblasts regulate RANKL, stimulation via cytokines and growth factors can increase osteoblast RANKL expression, often while simultaneously reducing bone formation. The additional RANKL-mediated osteoclast frequency and activity will, in turn, increase secretion of growth factors, or matrix-derived factors, which can ultimately increase tumor growth and bone destruction activity.

== Clinical significance ==
RANKL, through its ability to stimulate osteoclast formation and activity, is a critical mediator of bone resorption and overall bone density. Overproduction of RANKL is implicated in a variety of degenerative bone diseases, such as rheumatoid arthritis and psoriatic arthritis. In addition to degenerative bone diseases, bone metastases can also induce pain and other abnormal health complexities that can significantly reduce a cancer patient's quality of life. Some examples of these complications that are a consequence of bone metastasis are: hypercalcemia, pathological fractures and spinal cord compression. Some findings also suggest that some cancer cells, particularly prostate cancer cells, can activate an increase in bone remodeling and ultimately increase overall bone production. This increase in bone remodeling and bone production increases the overall growth of bone metastases. The overall control of bone remodeling is regulated by the binding of RANKL with its receptor or its decoy receptor, respectively, RANK and OPG.

=== Denosumab ===
Denosumab is an FDA-approved fully human monoclonal antibody to RANKL and during pre-clinical trials was first used to treat postmenopausal patients suffering with osteoporosis (PMO). In denosumab's third stage of the FDA's clinical trial, it was shown to: (1) decrease bone turnover, (2) reduce fractures in the PMO population, and (3) increase bone mineral density. The anti-RANKL antibody, denosumab, is also approved for use in cancer settings, and in those indications, it is branded as Xgeva. In both prostate and breast cancer, denosumab has been shown to reduce cancer treatment–induced bone loss.

==== Prostate cancer ====
The HALT-prostate cancer trial (also known as NCT00089674) included 1468 non-metastatic prostate cancer patients who were currently receiving androgen deprivation therapy. Randomly selected patients were given either 60 mg of denosumab or calcium and vitamin D supplements. This was done to measure the effectiveness of preventing treatment-induced bone loss. The patients who received 60 mg of denosumab showed a +5.6% increased in bone mineral density and a 1.5% decrease in bone fracture rates.

Another clinical trial (NCT00321620) was established to determine the safety and effectiveness of using denosumab compared to zoledronic acid. In this trial, they used 1901 bone metastatic prostate patients whom were also suffering with other complication of bone diseases. Again, patients were randomized, and some were given either 120 mg of denosumab or 4 mg of zoledronic acid. Patients who were given 120 mg of denosumab (in comparison to those who were given 4 mg of zoledronic acid) showed a greater increase in hypocalcemia, a greater resistance to bone turnover markers uNTx, and a delayed response in both pathological fractures and spinal cord compression. However, survival rates for both clinical groups were comparable.

==== Breast cancer ====
Hormone receptor-positive breast cancer patients have a significantly increased risk of complications such as osteopenia and osteoporosis. About two out of every three breast cancer patients are hormone receptor-positive. In the past several years, denosumab has been used in clinical trials, primarily because a large population is affected by bone complications among those who have breast cancer.

252 patients enlisted in the HALT-BC clinical trial (also known as NCT00089661). In addition to receiving vitamin D and calcium supplements, half of the patients were randomly assigned to receive 60 mg of denosumab, while the other half received a placebo. Patients given denosumab had an increase in lumbar spine bone mineral density, a decrease in bone turnover markers, with no significant change in survival rates.

NCT00321464 was another phase III RCT. Similar to NCT00321620 (prostate), this trial measured the safety and efficacy of denosumab versus zoledronic acid. Both groups showed similar survival rates and adverse event frequency.

==== Multiple myeloma ====
Patients who are diagnosed with multiple myeloma have approximately an 80-100% chance of developing bone complications due to an increase in activity and/or formation of osteoclasts and a decrease in activity of osteoblasts. In a stage II clinical trial, denosumab decreased bone turnover markers by blocking the RANKL/RANK pathway. Once this trial was completed, 1176 patients with either multiple myeloma or progressed cancers were entered into the stage III clinical trial (known as NCT00330759). The main objective of the NCT00330759 trial was to compare effects of patients who were given 120 mg of denosumab relative to patients give 4 mg of zoledronic acid. As a result of this trial, during a month, patients who received denosumab had a decrease in pathological fractures and spinal cord compression; however, as time progressed, it appeared that denosumab had significantly delayed bone complications. In both breast and prostate cancers, patients in either the denosumab or zoledronic acid groups appeared to have comparable adverse events and survival rates.

=== Medroxyprogesterone acetate ===
Women with menopause have often been given various types of postmenopausal hormone therapies to prevent osteoporosis and reduce menopausal symptoms. Medroxyprogesterone acetate (MPA) is a synthetic progestin and was commonly used as a contraceptive or used as a hormone therapy for endometriosis or osteoporosis. Recent studies suggest that using MPA increases the risk of developing breast cancer due to increased expression of RANKL. MPA causes a substantial induction of RANKL in mammary-gland epithelial cells, while deletion of RANKL decreases the incidence of MPA-induced breast cancer. Hence, inhibition of RANKL has potential for the prevention and treatment of breast cancer.

== See also ==
- Cluster of differentiation
- RANK
- Osteoprotegerin
- Osteoimmunology
