= Bone resorption =

Breakdown of bone tissue to be absorbed into the blood

Bone Resorption
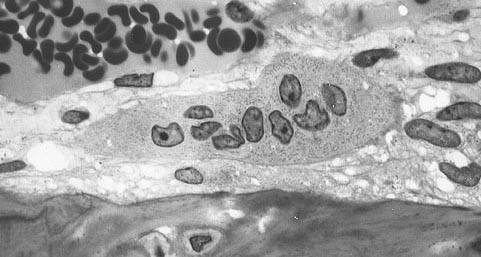
- Light micrograph of an osteoclast displaying typical distinguishing characteristics: a large cell with multiple nuclei and a "foamy" cytosol.
- Specialty: Rheumatology

Bone resorption is resorption of bone tissue – that is, the process by which osteoclasts break down the tissue in bones and release the minerals, resulting in a transfer of calcium from bone tissue to the blood.

The osteoclasts are multi-nucleated cells that contain numerous mitochondria and lysosomes. These are the cells responsible for the resorption of bone. Osteoblasts are generally present on the outer layer of bone, just beneath the periosteum. Attachment of the osteoclast to the osteon begins the process. The osteoclast then induces an infolding of its cell membrane and secretes collagenase and other enzymes important in the resorption process. High levels of calcium, magnesium, phosphate and products of collagen will be released into the extracellular fluid as the osteoclasts tunnel into the mineralized bone. Osteoclasts are prominent in the tissue destruction found in psoriatic arthritis and rheumatological disorders.

The human body is in a constant state of bone remodeling. Bone remodeling is a process which maintains bone strength and ion homeostasis by replacing discrete parts of old bone with newly synthesized packets of proteinaceous matrix. Bone is resorbed by osteoclasts, and is deposited by osteoblasts in a process called ossification. Osteocyte activity plays a key role in this process. Conditions that result in a decrease in bone mass can either be caused by an increase in resorption or by a decrease in ossification. During childhood, bone formation exceeds resorption. As the aging process occurs, resorption exceeds formation.

Bone resorption rates are much higher in post-menopausal older women due to estrogen deficiency related with menopause. Common treatments include drugs that increase bone mineral density. Bisphosphonates. RANKL inhibitors, SERMs—selective oestrogen receptor modulators, hormone replacement therapy and calcitonin are some of the common treatments. Light weight-bearing exercise tends to eliminate the negative effects of bone resorption.

== Regulation ==
Bone resorption is highly stimulated or inhibited by signals from other parts of the body, depending on the demand for calcium.

Calcium-sensing membrane receptors in the parathyroid gland monitor calcium levels in the extracellular fluid. Low levels of calcium stimulates the release of parathyroid hormone (PTH) from chief cells of the parathyroid gland. In addition to its effects on kidney and intestine, PTH increases the number and activity of osteoclasts. The increase in activity of already existing osteoclasts is the initial effect of PTH, and begins in minutes and increases over a few hours. Continued elevation of PTH levels increases the abundance of osteoclasts. This leads to a greater resorption of calcium and phosphate ions.

High levels of calcium in the blood, on the other hand, leads to decreased PTH release from the parathyroid gland, decreasing the number and activity of osteoclasts, resulting in less bone resorption. Vitamin D increases absorption of calcium and phosphate in the intestinal tract, leading to elevated levels of plasma calcium, and thus lower bone resorption.

Calcitriol (1,25-dihydroxycholecalciferol) is the active form of vitamin D_{3}. It has numerous functions involved in blood calcium levels. Recent research indicates that calcitriol leads to a reduction in osteoclast formation, and bone resorption. It follows that an increase in vitamin D_{3} intake should lead to a decrease in bone resorption — it has been shown that oral administration of vitamin D does not linearly correlate to increased serum levels of calcifediol, the precursor to calcitriol.

Calcitonin is a hormone secreted by the thyroid in humans. Calcitonin decreases osteoclast activity, and decreases the formation of new osteoclasts, resulting in decreased resorption. Calcitonin has a greater effect in young children than in adults, and plays a smaller role in bone remodeling than PTH.

In some cases where bone resorption outpaces ossification, the bone is broken down much faster than it can be renewed. The bone becomes more porous and fragile, exposing people to the risk of fractures. Depending on where in the body bone resorption occurs, additional problems like tooth loss can arise. This can be caused by conditions such as hyperparathyroidism and hypovitaminosis D or even decreased hormonal production in the elderly. Some diseases with symptoms of decreased bone density are osteoporosis, and rickets.

Some people who experience increased bone resorption and decreased bone formation are astronauts. Due to the condition of being in a zero-gravity environment, astronauts do not need to work their musculoskeletal system as hard as when on earth. Ossification decreases due to a lack of stress, while resorption increases, leading to a net decrease in bone density.

== Alcoholism ==
The effects of alcohol on bone mineral density (BMD) are well-known and well-studied in animal and human populations. Through direct and indirect pathways, prolonged ethanol exposure increases fracture risk by decreasing bone mineral density and promoting osteoporosis. Indirect effects of excessive alcohol use occur via growth hormone, sex steroids, and oxidative stress.

Growth hormone is an important regulator of bone growth and remodeling in adults, and it acts via insulin-like growth factor I (IGF1) to stimulate osteoblastic differentiation. Chronic alcoholism decreases the levels of IGF1, which suppresses the ability of GH to increase bone mineral density.

Increasing alcohol consumption is linked with decreasing testosterone and serum estradiol levels, which in turn lead to the activation of RANK (a TNF receptor) protein that promote osteoclast formation. Oxidative stress results when ethanol induces NOX expression, resulting in ROS production in osteoblasts which can ultimately result in cell senescence. Direct effects of chronic alcoholism are apparent in osteoblasts, osteoclasts and osteocytes. Ethanol suppresses the activity and differentiation of osteoblasts.

At the same time, it has a direct effect on osteoclast activity. This results in an increased bone resorption rate and a decreased bone mineral density due to increased pit numbers and pit areas in the bone. Research has shown that viable osteocytes (another type of bone cell) may prevent osteoclastogenesis, whereas apoptotic osteocytes tend to induce osteoclast stimulation. Stimulation of osteocyte apoptosis by alcohol exposure may explain decreased bone mineral density in chronic drinkers.

== Clinical importance ==
Bone resorption is an integral part of both physiological and pathological processes.

Pathological bone resorption could be limited (local) which is induced by local inflammation, for example, trauma or infection, resorption activated local factors, including growth factors, cytokines, prostaglandins, etc., are simultaneously triggered. This bone resorption could also be observed in patients with many metabolic skeleton diseases, especially osteopenia and osteoporosis, endocrine diseases, rheumatic disorders, and other cases, as well as in patients with genetic disorders.

Physiological bone resorption is an integral part of bone functioning, while the bone is constantly growing thanks to two processes — breakdown and formation of bone tissue. Locally, it could be manifested in tooth eruption when the movement of a tooth follicle is followed by an active resorption of jaw bone tissue. Resorption of old bone and formation of a new one are balanced in a well-developed skeleton. However, resorption starts taking a large part in remodeling processes with age. Dentistry sees resorption as dissolution or breakdown of a tooth structure. This could be inflammation and dentine or cement loss.

Bone tissue is a dynamic system with active metabolism. Bone tissue remodelling or bone remodeling is a successive chain of old bone matrix removal and its replacement with a new one. These processes make a child's skeleton grow and extend, while childhood is characterized by bone tissue growth rather than its resorption.

== See also ==
- Bone remodeling
- Nuclear factor-kappa B
