= Osteoprotegerin =

Mammalian protein found in Homo sapiens

TNFRSF11B

Identifiers
- Aliases: TNFRSF11B, OCIF, OPG, PDB5, TR1, tumor necrosis factor receptor superfamily member 11b, TNF receptor superfamily member 11b
- External IDs: OMIM: 602643; MGI: 109587; GeneCards: TNFRSF11B
Available structures
PDB	Ortholog search: PDBe RCSB
PDB	List of PDB id codes 3URF

Gene location (Human)
Chr.	Chromosome 8 (human)
Band	8q24.12	Start	118,923,557 bp
Band	8q24.12	End	118,951,885 bp

Gene location (Mouse)
Chr.	Chromosome 15 (mouse)
Band	15|15 D1	Start	54,114,015 bp
Band	15|15 D1	End	54,141,880 bp
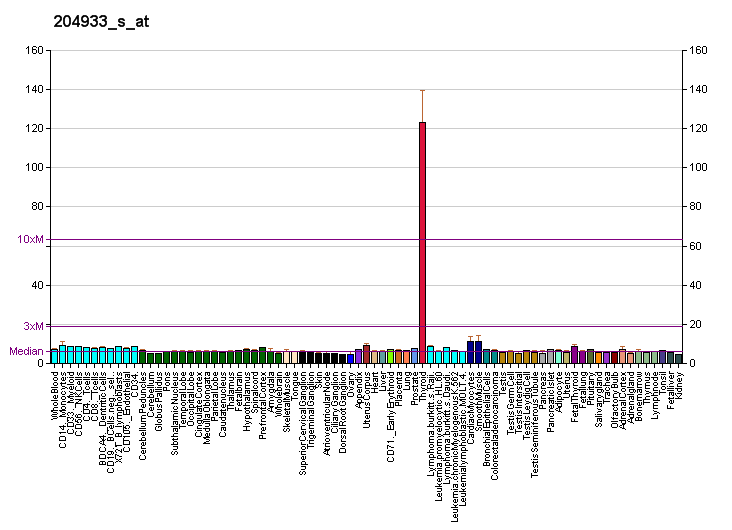

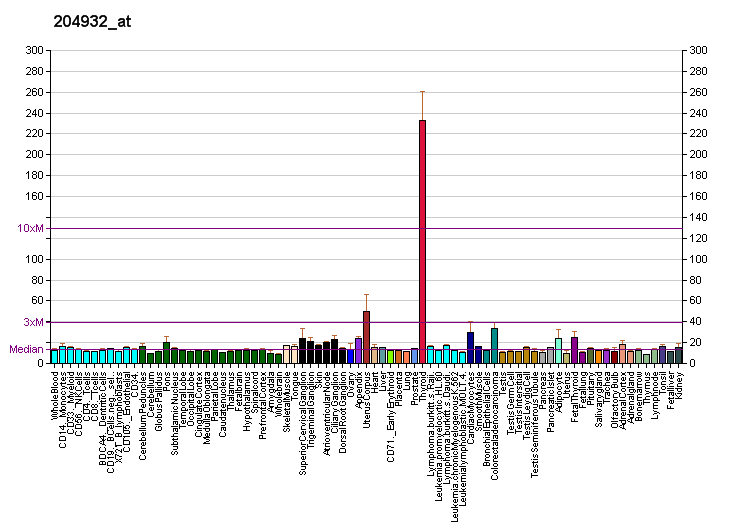
RNA expression pattern
Bgee	Human / Mouse (ortholog); Top expressed in: cartilage tissue; ascending aorta; right coronary artery; Descending thoracic aorta; stromal cell of endometrium; Achilles tendon; left coronary artery; left lobe of thyroid gland; right lobe of thyroid gland; popliteal artery / Top expressed in: decidua; gastrula; calvaria; lumbar subsegment of spinal cord; tunica media of zone of aorta; intercostal muscle; stria vascularis; vestibular sensory epithelium; embryo; lumbar spinal ganglion; More reference expression data
BioGPS	More reference expression data
Gene ontology
Molecular function	cytokine activity; tumor necrosis factor-activated receptor activity; protein binding; signaling receptor activity
Cellular component	plasma membrane; integral component of plasma membrane; extracellular region; extracellular space; extracellular matrix
Biological process	regulation of apoptotic process; skeletal system development; negative regulation of odontogenesis of dentin-containing tooth; response to nutrient; extracellular matrix organization; response to magnesium ion; tumor necrosis factor-mediated signaling pathway; response to arsenic-containing substance; response to estrogen; response to lipopolysaccharide; regulation of cell population proliferation; immune response; response to inorganic substance; apoptotic signaling pathway; inflammatory response; signal transduction; negative regulation of bone resorption; apoptotic process; regulation of signaling receptor activity
Sources:Amigo / QuickGO
Orthologs
Databases	NCBI: entry; OMA: entry
Species	Human	Mouse
Entrez	4982	18383
Ensembl	ENSG00000164761	ENSMUSG00000063727
UniProt	O00300	O08712
RefSeq (mRNA)	NM_002546	NM_008764
RefSeq (protein)	NP_002537	NP_032790
Location (UCSC)	Chr 8: 118.92 – 118.95 Mb	Chr 15: 54.11 – 54.14 Mb
PubMed search
- Wikidata
View/Edit Human	View/Edit Mouse

Osteoprotegerin (OPG), also known as osteoclastogenesis inhibitory factor (OCIF) or tumour necrosis factor receptor superfamily member 11B (TNFRSF11B), is a cytokine receptor of the tumour necrosis factor (TNF) receptor superfamily encoded by the TNFRSF11B gene.

OPG was first discovered as a novel secreted TNFR related protein that played a role in the regulation of bone density and later for its role as a decoy receptor for receptor activator of nuclear factor kappa-B ligand (RANKL). OPG also binds to TNF-related apoptosis-inducing ligand (TRAIL) and inhibits TRAIL induced apoptosis of specific cells, including tumour cells. Other OPG ligands include syndecan-1, glycosaminoglycans, von Willebrand factor, and factor VIII-von Willebrand factor complex.

OPG has been identified as having a role in tumour growth and metastasis, heart disease, immune system development and signalling, mental health, diabetes, and the prevention of pre-eclampsia and osteoporosis during pregnancy.

== Biochemistry ==
OPG is largely expressed by osteoblast lineage cells of bone, epithelial cells of the gastrointestinal tract, lung, breast and skin, vascular endothelial cells, as well as B-cells and dendritic cells in the immune system.

OPG is a soluble glycoprotein which can be found as either a 60-kDa monomer or a 120-kDa dimer linked by disulfide bonds. The dimerisation of OPG is necessary for RANK-RANKL inhibition as dimerisation increases the affinity of OPG for RANKL (from a K_{D} of 3 μM as a monomer to 10nM as a dimer). As a monomer, OPG would have insufficient affinity for RANKL to compete with RANK and effectively suppress RANK-RANKL interactions.

OPG proteins are made up of 380 amino acids which form seven functional domains. Domains 1-4 are cysteine-rich N-terminal domains that interact with RANKL during binding. Domains 5-6 are death domains that contribute to the dimerisation of OPG. Domain 7 is a C-terminal heparin-binding domain ending with a cysteine (Cys-400) which also plays an important role in the dimerisation of OPG.

OPG expression can be upregulated by IL-1β, 1α,25(OH)_{2}D_{3}, Wnt/β-catenin signalling through Wnt16, Wnt4 and Wnt3a TNFα and estrogen. OPG expression can also be upregulated transcriptionally through DNA binding sites for estrogen receptor α (ER-α) and TCF in the promoter region of the OPG gene. Downregulation of OPG can be effected by TGF-β1, PTH and DNA methylation of a CpG island in the OPG gene.

=== Estrogen and OPG regulation ===
OPG expression in osteoblast lineage cells is highly regulated by estrogens such as estradiol (E2). E2 transcriptionally regulates OPG expression through binding estrogen receptors (predominantly ER-α) on osteoblast lineage cell surfaces. The E2-ERα complex then translocates into the cell nucleus where it binds an estrogen response element in the promoter region of the OPG gene to upregulate OPG mRNA transcription.

Estrogens can also post-transcriptionally regulate OPG protein expression through the suppression of the microRNA (miRNA) miR-145. miR-145 binds miRNA binding sites in the 3'UTR of OPG mRNA transcripts and suppresses the translation of OPG proteins. Estrogen binds its ER-β receptor on the cell surface to suppress many miRNAs, including miR-145, thus blocking inhibition of OPG mRNA translation.

Estrogen suppresses osteoclastogenesis through the upregulation of OPG expression in osteoblast lineage cells. Androgens such as testosterone and DHT also inhibit osteoclastogenesis, however androgens act directly through androgen receptors on osteoclast precursor cells without affecting OPG expression in osteoblasts. Further, in the absence of aromatase enzymes converting testosterone into estrogen, testosterone and DHT downregulate OPG mRNA expression.

== Function ==
OPG plays an important role in bone metabolism as a decoy receptor for RANKL in the RANK/RANKL/OPG axis, inhibiting osteoclastogenesis and bone resorption. OPG has also been shown to bind and inhibit TNF-related apoptosis-inducing ligand (TRAIL) which is responsible for inducing apoptosis in tumour, infected and mutated cells.

=== Bone metabolism ===
The RANK/RANKL/OPG axis is a critical pathway in maintaining the symbiosis between bone resorption by osteoclasts and bone formation by osteoblasts. RANKL is released by osteoblast lineage cells and binds to receptor RANK on the surface of osteoclast progenitor cells RANK-RANKL binding activates the nuclear factor kappa B (NF-κB) pathway resulting in the upregulation of the transcription factor nuclear factor of activated T-cells cytoplasmic 1 (NFATc1). NFATc1 is a master regulator for the expression of essential cytokines during the differentiation of osteoclast precursor cells into mature osteoclasts, known as osteoclastogenesis. Mature osteoclasts then bind to bone through tight junctions and release digestive enzymes to resorb the old bone. As bone is resorbed, collagen and minerals are released into the local microenvironment creating both the space and minerals needed for osteoblasts to lay down new bone. As a decoy receptor for RANKL, OPG inhibits RANK-RANKL interactions thus suppressing osteoclastogenesis and bone resorption.

OPG is also a decoy receptor for TRAIL, another regulator of osteoclastogenesis in osteoclast precursor cells and an autocrine signal for mature osteoclast cell death. TRAIL induces osteoclastogenesis by binding to specific TRAIL receptors on osteoclast precursor cell surfaces, inducing TRAF6 signalling, activating NF-κB signalling and upregulating NFATc1 expression. During osteoclastogenesis the different TRAIL receptors on the cell surface change resulting in an increase of apoptosis inducing TRAIL receptors expressed on mature osteoclasts. As a decoy receptor for both RANKL and TRAIL, OPG simultaneously suppresses osteoclastogenesis while also inhibiting TRAIL induced cell death of mature osteoclast cells. OPG has an equally high affinity for RANKL and TRAIL suggesting that it is equally effective at blocking osteoclastogenesis and inhibiting osteoclast apoptosis.

== Disease ==
=== Atrophic nonunion shaft fractures ===
A normal steady state of bone metabolism seems to be present in patients with atrophic nonunion fractures, despite the high serum OPG. Only serum OPG was significantly higher in the patients compared to healed and healing controls. (49)

=== Osteoporosis ===
Osteoporosis is a bone-related disease caused by increased rates of bone resorption compared to bone formation. A higher rate of resorption is often caused by increased osteoclastogenesis and results in symptoms of osteopenia such as excessive bone loss and low bone mineral density.

Osteoporosis is often triggered in post-menopausal women due to reduced estrogen levels associated with the depletion of hormone-releasing ovarian follicles. Decreasing estrogen levels result in the downregulation of OPG expression and reduced inhibition of RANKL. Therefore RANKL can more readily bind to RANK and cause the increased osteoclastogenesis and bone resorption seen in osteoporosis. Decreased estrogen is a common cause of osteoporosis that can be seen in other conditions such as ovariectomy, ovarian failure, anorexia, and hyperprolactinaemia.

Osteoblastic synthesis of bone does not increase to compensate for the accelerated bone resorption as the lower estrogen levels result in increased rates of osteoblast apoptosis. The higher rate of bone resorption compared to bone formation leads to the increased porosity and low bone mineral density of individuals with osteoporosis.

=== Cancer ===
Tumour endothelial cells have been found to express higher levels of OPG when compared to normal endothelial cells. When in contact with tumour cells, endothelial cells express higher levels of OPG in response to integrin α_{v}β_{3} ligation and the stimulation of NF-kB signalling.

OPG expression has been found to promote tumour growth and survival through driving tumour vascularisation and inhibiting TRAIL-induced apoptosis.

OPG has been identified as one of the many pro-angiogenic factors involved in the vascularisation of tumours. Tumour angiogenesis is required for tumour growth and movement as it supplies the tumour with nutrients and allows metastatic cells to enter the bloodstream. As a decoy receptor for TRAIL, OPG also promotes tumour cell survival by inhibiting TRAIL-induced apoptosis of tumour cells.

==== Bone metastasis ====
Bone is a common site of metastasis in cancers such as breast, prostate and lung cancer. In osteolytic bone metastases, tumour cells migrate to the bone and release cytokines such as parathyroid hormone-related protein (PTHrP), IL-8 and PGE2. These cytokines act on osteoblasts to increase RANKL and decrease OPG expression resulting in excess bone resorption. During resorption osteoclasts release nutrients such as growth factors and calcium from the mineralised bone matrix which cultivates a supportive environment for the proliferation and survival of tumour cells.

Most bone metastases result in osteolytic lesions, however prostate cancer causes osteoblastic lesions characterised by excess bone formation and high bone density. Prostate cancer releases cytokines such as insulin-like growth factor (IGF), endothelin-1, bone morphogenetic proteins (BMPs), sclerostin and Wnt proteins that act on local bone to increase osteoblast proliferation and activity. Wnt proteins also act on osteoblasts to upregulate OPG expression through β-catenin signalling and suppress osteoclastic bone resorption.

==== Multiple myeloma ====
Multiple myeloma is a type of cancer involving malignant plasma cells, called myeloma cells, within the bone marrow. Multiple myeloma is associated with osteolytic bone lesions as the usually high levels of OPG in the bone marrow are diminished resulting in increased osteoclastic absorption. The reduced OPG in multiple myeloma is caused by suppression of both constitutive OPG transcription and the OPG inducing cytokines TGF-β and Wnt. In addition, the efficacy of OPG in bone marrow is impeded with multiple myeloma by excessive binding to syndecan-1. OPG binds to syndecan-1 on the surface of normal and multiple myeloma plasma cells to be internalised and degraded. However the overabundance of proliferating myeloma cells results in the excessive binding and inhibition of OPG by syndecan-1. Simultaneously, multiple myeloma is associated with unusually high levels of osteoclastogenesis-inducing factors. The decreased OPG transcription and increased OPG protein degradation combined with increased osteoclastogenesis result in the osteolytic lesions that are characteristic of multiple myeloma.

==== Otosclerosis ====
Otosclerosis is a disorder of the middle ear, characterized by abnormal bone growth at the foot plate of the stapes which affect its mobility, resulting in progressive hearing loss. OPG gene polymorphisms c.9C>G and c.30+15C> have shown genetic association with OTSC in Indian and Tunisian populations. Some of the reports have shown significantly reduced or missing OPG expression in otosclerotic tissues which might be a causal factor for abnormal bone remodeling during disease manifestation.

=== Juvenile Paget's disease ===
This is a rare autosomal recessive disease that is associated with mutations in this gene.
