= Heinrich Unverricht =

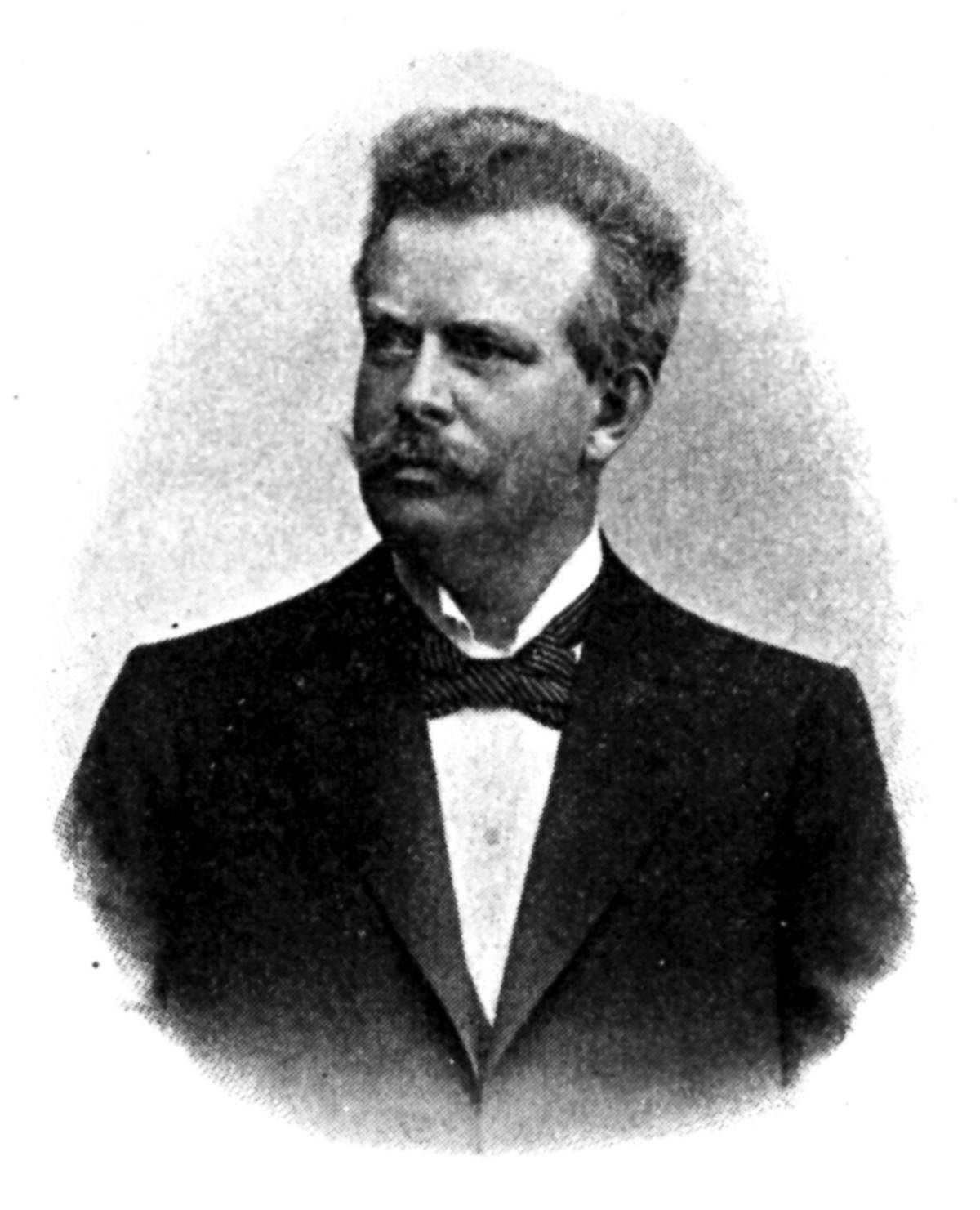
- Born: 18 September 1853; Breslau, Kingdom of Prussia
- Died: 22 April 1912 (aged 58); Magdeburg, Germany
- Education: University of Breslau
- Scientific career
- Doctoral advisor: Michael Anton Biermer

Heinrich Unverricht (18 September 1853 – 22 April 1912) was a German internist who was a native of Breslau.

== Education and Medical career ==
In 1877 he obtained his doctorate from the University of Breslau, where he was a student of Michael Anton Biermer (1827-1892). Later he became professor at Jena (1886) and Dorpat (1888), where he resigned in 1892 for political reasons, and became director of the city hospital at Magdeburg-Sudenburg, until his retirement in 1911. During this time he also served as president of the Magdeburg Medical Society, and as editor of the Zentralblatt für innere Medizin.

Unverricht published over fifty medical works, including Studien über die Lungenentzündung, his prize-winning doctorate thesis on pneumonia.

== Research ==
Heinrich Unverricht is most remembered for his research of epilepsy, especially his work with progressive myoclonus epilepsies (PME). In 1891 he described a form of PME that was later come to be known as "Unverricht-Lundborg disease" (sometimes referred also as "Wagner–Unverricht syndrome".).

Equally notable, however, following Wagner (1863) and Virchow's (1866) initial clinical descriptions, in 1891 he developed the concept of an intimate connection between rash and muscle weakness that defined a new disorder:

"...it seems to me that the skin appearance plays such an important role in the disease picture that the designation Polymyositis is not completely accurate. In our case, the partnership of the skin and muscle disease allows us to use the elocution Dermatomyositis..." (translation).

== Death ==
Unverricht, died of hemiplegia complicating chronic nephritis on April 22 1912, at Magdeburg, Germany.
