= MAGI2 =

Protein-coding gene in the species Homo sapiens

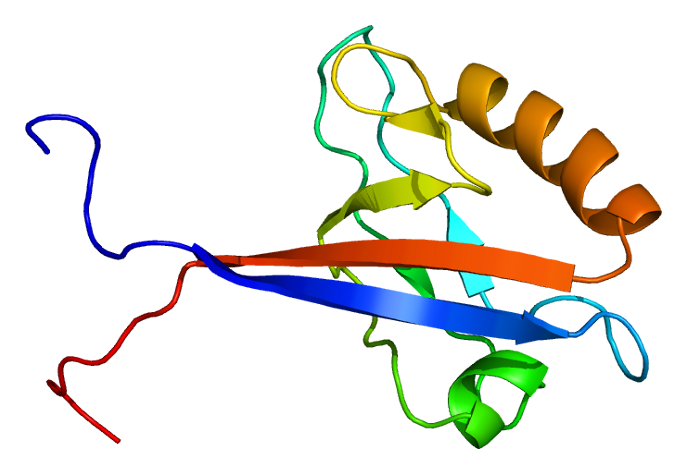

Identifiers
- Aliases: MAGI2, ACVRIP1, AIP-1, AIP1, ARIP1, MAGI-2, SSCAM, membrane associated guanylate kinase, WW and PDZ domain containing 2, NPHS15
- External IDs: OMIM: 606382; MGI: 1354953; GeneCards: MAGI2
Available structures
| PDB | Ortholog search: PDBe RCSB |
| PDB | List of PDB id codes 1UEP, 1UEQ, 1UEW, 1UJV, 1WFV |

Gene location (Human)
| Chr. | Chromosome 7 (human) |
| Band | 7q21.11 | Start | 78,017,055 bp |
| Band | 7q21.11 | End | 79,453,667 bp |

Gene location (Mouse)
| Chr. | Chromosome 5 (mouse) |
| Band | 5|5 A3 | Start | 19,432,034 bp |
| Band | 5|5 A3 | End | 20,909,790 bp |
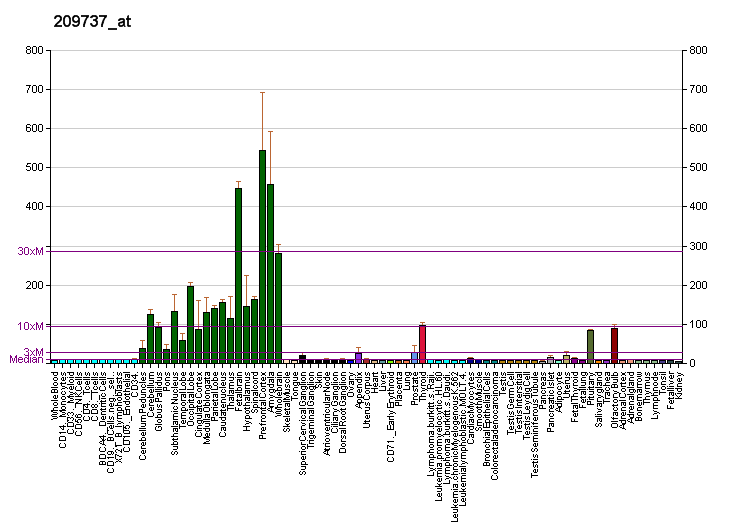

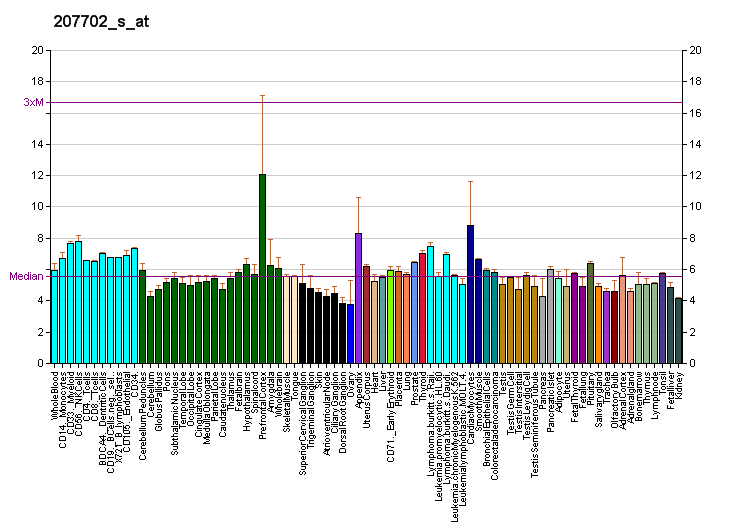
RNA expression pattern
| Bgee | Human / Mouse (ortholog); Top expressed in: Achilles tendon; corpus callosum; Brodmann area 23; middle temporal gyrus; glomerulus; metanephric glomerulus; Brodmann area 46; parietal lobe; entorhinal cortex; postcentral gyrus / Top expressed in: Rostral migratory stream; primary motor cortex; cingulate gyrus; substantia nigra; Region I of hippocampus proper; nucleus accumbens; globus pallidus; primary visual cortex; sciatic nerve; arcuate nucleus; More reference expression data |
| BioGPS | More reference expression data |
Gene ontology
| Molecular function | signal transducer activity; SMAD binding; phosphatase binding; beta-1 adrenergic receptor binding; molecular adaptor activity; type II activin receptor binding; signaling receptor complex adaptor activity; protein binding; activin receptor binding; kinase activity |
| Cellular component | late endosome; cytoplasm; synapse; cell junction; nucleus; neuron projection; postsynaptic density; membrane; dendrite; perinuclear region of cytoplasm; slit diaphragm; bicellular tight junction; plasma membrane; endosome; protein-containing complex; cell-cell junction |
| Biological process | receptor clustering; negative regulation of cell population proliferation; positive regulation of neuron projection development; neuroligin clustering involved in postsynaptic membrane assembly; signal transduction; negative regulation of activin receptor signaling pathway; nerve growth factor signaling pathway; planar cell polarity pathway involved in axis elongation; SMAD protein signal transduction; positive regulation of receptor internalization; protein heterooligomerization; negative regulation of protein kinase B signaling; nervous system development; glomerular visceral epithelial cell development; positive regulation of synaptic vesicle clustering; cellular response to nerve growth factor stimulus; positive regulation of phosphoprotein phosphatase activity; negative regulation of cell migration; positive regulation of signal transduction; phosphorylation |
Sources:Amigo / QuickGO
Orthologs
| Databases | NCBI: entry; OMA: entry |
| Species | Human | Mouse |
| Entrez | 9863 | 50791 |
| Ensembl | ENSG00000187391 | ENSMUSG00000040003 |
| UniProt | Q86UL8 | Q9WVQ1 |
| RefSeq (mRNA) | NM_001301128; NM_012301 | NM_001170745; NM_001170746; NM_015823 |
| RefSeq (protein) | NP_001288057; NP_036433 | NP_001164216; NP_001164217; NP_056638 |
| Location (UCSC) | Chr 7: 78.02 – 79.45 Mb | Chr 5: 19.43 – 20.91 Mb |
| PubMed search |
- Wikidata
| View/Edit Human | View/Edit Mouse |

Membrane-associated guanylate kinase, WW and PDZ domain-containing protein 2 also known as membrane-associated guanylate kinase inverted 2 (MAGI-2) and atrophin-1-interacting protein 1 (AIP-1) is an enzyme that in humans is encoded by the MAGI2 gene.

== Function ==
The protein encoded by this gene interacts with atrophin-1. Atrophin-1 contains a polyglutamine repeat, expansion of which is responsible for dentatorubral-pallidoluysian atrophy. This encoded protein is characterized by two WW domains, a guanylate kinase-like domain, and multiple PDZ domains. It has structural similarity to the membrane-associated guanylate kinase homologue (MAGUK) family.

== Interactions ==
MAGI2 has been shown to interact with ATN1 and PTEN (gene).
