= Johann Paul Uhle =

German physician and pathologist

- Born: 17 April 1827; Nossen, Kingdom of Saxony
- Died: 4 November 1861 (aged 34); Jena, Kingdom of Saxony
- Citizenship: German
- Education: University of Leipzig
- Known for: Co-author of Handbuch der allgemeinen Pathologie
- Scientific career
- Fields: Physician, Pathology
- Workplaces: University of Leipzig; Imperial University of Dorpat; University of Jena

Johann Paul Uhle (17 April 1827 – 4 November 1861) was a German medical doctor and pathologist born in Nossen, in the Kingdom of Saxony. He died of tuberculosis in Jena at the age of 34.

== Education and academic career ==
In 1852 he received his medical doctorate at the University of Leipzig. He was an assistant at St. George's Hospital at Leipzig, and in 1859 became a professor at the Imperial University of Dorpat. In 1860 he relocated to Jena as a professor of special pathology and director of the medical clinic.

== Works and scientific contributions ==
With Ernst Leberecht Wagner (1829-1888), Uhle was co-author of an influential textbook of general pathology titled "Handbuch der allgemeinen Pathologie". It was published in seven editions, and was translated into English, French, Polish and Greek. Uhle was also author of "Der Winter in Oberägypten als klimatisches Heilmittel" (On the Winter in Upper Egypt as a Climatic Remedy).

== Publications ==
- Der Winter in Oberägypten als klimatisches Heilmittel. B. G. Teubner, Leipzig, 1858.
- (with Ernst Leberecht Wagner) Handbuch der allgemeinen Pathologie. Wigand, Leipzig, 1862; 7th ed. 1876.

== See also ==
- Ernst Leberecht Wagner
- Pathology
- History of pathology
- University of Leipzig
- Imperial University of Dorpat
- University of Jena
