= Cathepsin B =

Protein-coding gene in the species Homo sapiens

CTSB
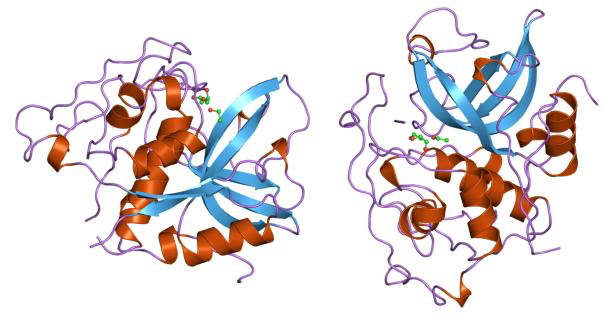

Identifiers
- Aliases: CTSB, APPS, CPSB, cathepsin B, RECEUP
- External IDs: OMIM: 116810; MGI: 88561; GeneCards: CTSB
Available structures
PDB	Ortholog search: PDBe RCSB
PDB	List of PDB id codes 3PBH, 1CSB, 1GMY, 1HUC, 1PBH, 2IPP, 2PBH, 3AI8, 3CBJ, 3CBK, 3K9M
Enzyme activity
EC #	BRENDA	ExPASy	KEGG	MetaCyc
3.4.22.1	↗	↗	↗	↗

Gene location (Human)
Chr.	Chromosome 8 (human)
Band	8p23.1	Start	11,842,524 bp
Band	8p23.1	End	11,869,448 bp

Gene location (Mouse)
Chr.	Chromosome 14 (mouse)
Band	14 D1|14 33.24 cM	Start	63,359,911 bp
Band	14 D1|14 33.24 cM	End	63,383,372 bp
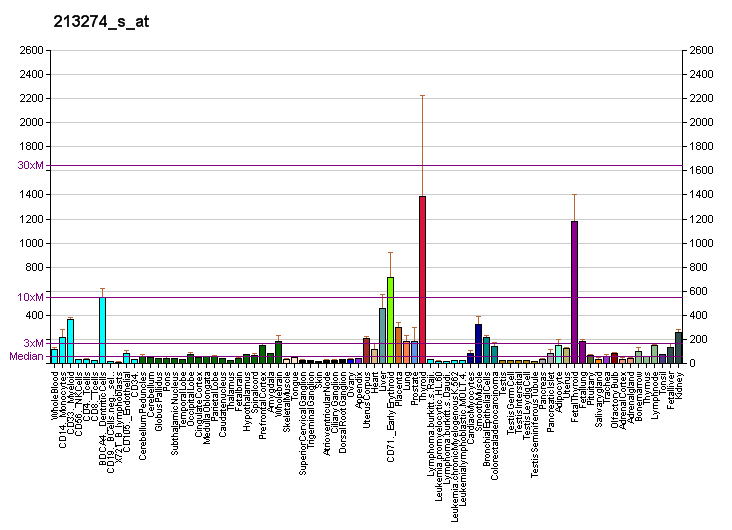

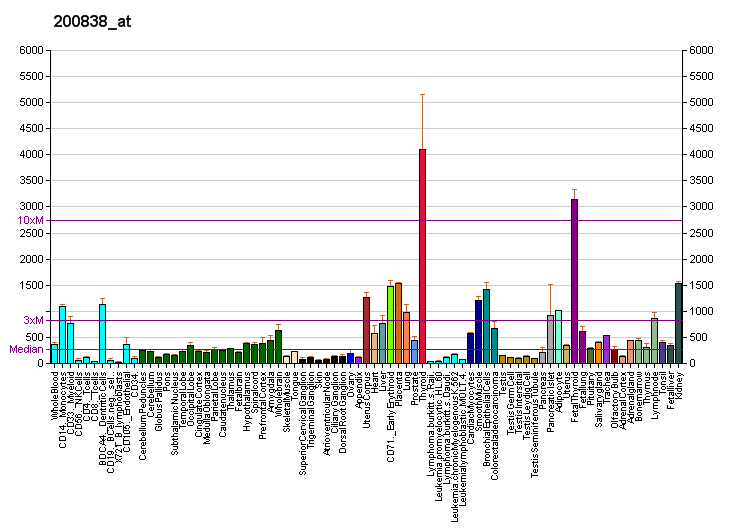

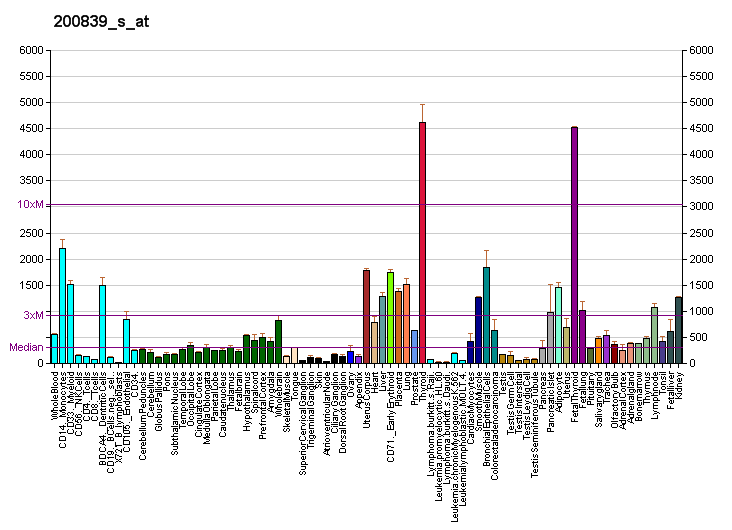
RNA expression pattern
Bgee	Human / Mouse (ortholog); Top expressed in: stromal cell of endometrium; right lobe of thyroid gland; left lobe of thyroid gland; appendix; canal of the cervix; gallbladder; ectocervix; smooth muscle tissue; olfactory zone of nasal mucosa; monocyte / Top expressed in: stroma of bone marrow; calvaria; white adipose tissue; subcutaneous adipose tissue; epithelium of stomach; brown adipose tissue; tibiofemoral joint; tunica adventitia of aorta; decidua; lactiferous gland; More reference expression data
BioGPS	More reference expression data
Gene ontology
Molecular function	cysteine-type peptidase activity; collagen binding; peptidase activity; protein binding; cysteine-type endopeptidase activity; hydrolase activity; proteoglycan binding; serine-type endopeptidase activity; endopeptidase activity
Cellular component	intracellular membrane-bounded organelle; melanosome; intracellular anatomical structure; extracellular region; endolysosome lumen; nucleolus; mitochondrion; lysosome; extracellular exosome; perinuclear region of cytoplasm; extracellular space; ficolin-1-rich granule lumen; collagen-containing extracellular matrix
Biological process	regulation of apoptotic process; epithelial cell differentiation; proteolysis; toll-like receptor signaling pathway; decidualization; cellular response to thyroid hormone stimulus; collagen catabolic process; viral entry into host cell; regulation of catalytic activity; proteolysis involved in cellular protein catabolic process; neutrophil degranulation
Sources:Amigo / QuickGO
Orthologs
Databases	NCBI: entry; OMA: entry
Species	Human	Mouse
Entrez	1508	13030
Ensembl	ENSG00000164733; ENSG00000285132	ENSMUSG00000021939
UniProt	P07858	P10605
RefSeq (mRNA)	NM_001908; NM_147780; NM_147781; NM_147782; NM_147783 NM_001317237	NM_007798
RefSeq (protein)	NP_001304166; NP_001899; NP_680090; NP_680091; NP_680092 NP_680093	NP_031824
Location (UCSC)	Chr 8: 11.84 – 11.87 Mb	Chr 14: 63.36 – 63.38 Mb
PubMed search
- Wikidata
View/Edit Human	View/Edit Mouse

Cathepsin B belongs to a family of lysosomal cysteine proteases known as the cysteine cathepsins and plays an important role in intracellular proteolysis. In humans, cathepsin B is encoded by the CTSB gene. Cathepsin B is upregulated in certain cancers, in pre-malignant lesions, and in various other pathological conditions.

== Structure ==
=== Gene ===
The CTSB gene is located at chromosome 8p22, consisting of 13 exons. The promoter of CTSB gene contains a GC-rich region including many SP1 sites, which is similar to housekeeping genes. At least five transcript variants encoding the same protein have been found for this gene.

=== Protein ===
Cathepsin B is synthesized on the rough endoplasmic reticulum as a preproenzyme of 339 amino acids with a signal peptide of 17 amino acids. Procathepsin B of 43/46 kDa is then transported to the Golgi apparatus, where cathepsin B is formed. Mature cathepsin B is composed of a heavy chain of 25-26 kDa and a light chain of 5kDa, which are linked by a dimer of disulfide.

== Function ==
Cathepsin B may enhance the activity of other proteases, including matrix metalloproteinase, urokinase (serine protease urokinase plasminogen activator), and cathepsin D, and thus it has an essential position for the proteolysis of extracellular matrix components, intercellular communication disruption, and reduced protease inhibitor expression.

Cells may become carcinogenic when cathepsin B is unregulated.

== Potential in disease ==
Cathepsin B has been proposed as a potentially effective biomarker for a variety of cancers. Overexpression of cathepsin B is correlated with invasive and metastatic cancers.

Cathepsin B has been shown to be involved in the pathogenesis of pancreatitis, by prematurely activating the digestive enzyme trypsinogen within the pancreas, leading to autodigestion of acinar cells.

== Interactions ==
Cathepsin B has been shown to interact with:

- CTSD
- CSTA,
- CSTB, and
- S100A10.

Cathepsin B is inhibited by:

- Nitroxoline
- CA-074

== See also ==
- Cathepsins
