= Ernst Leberecht Wagner =

German pathologist

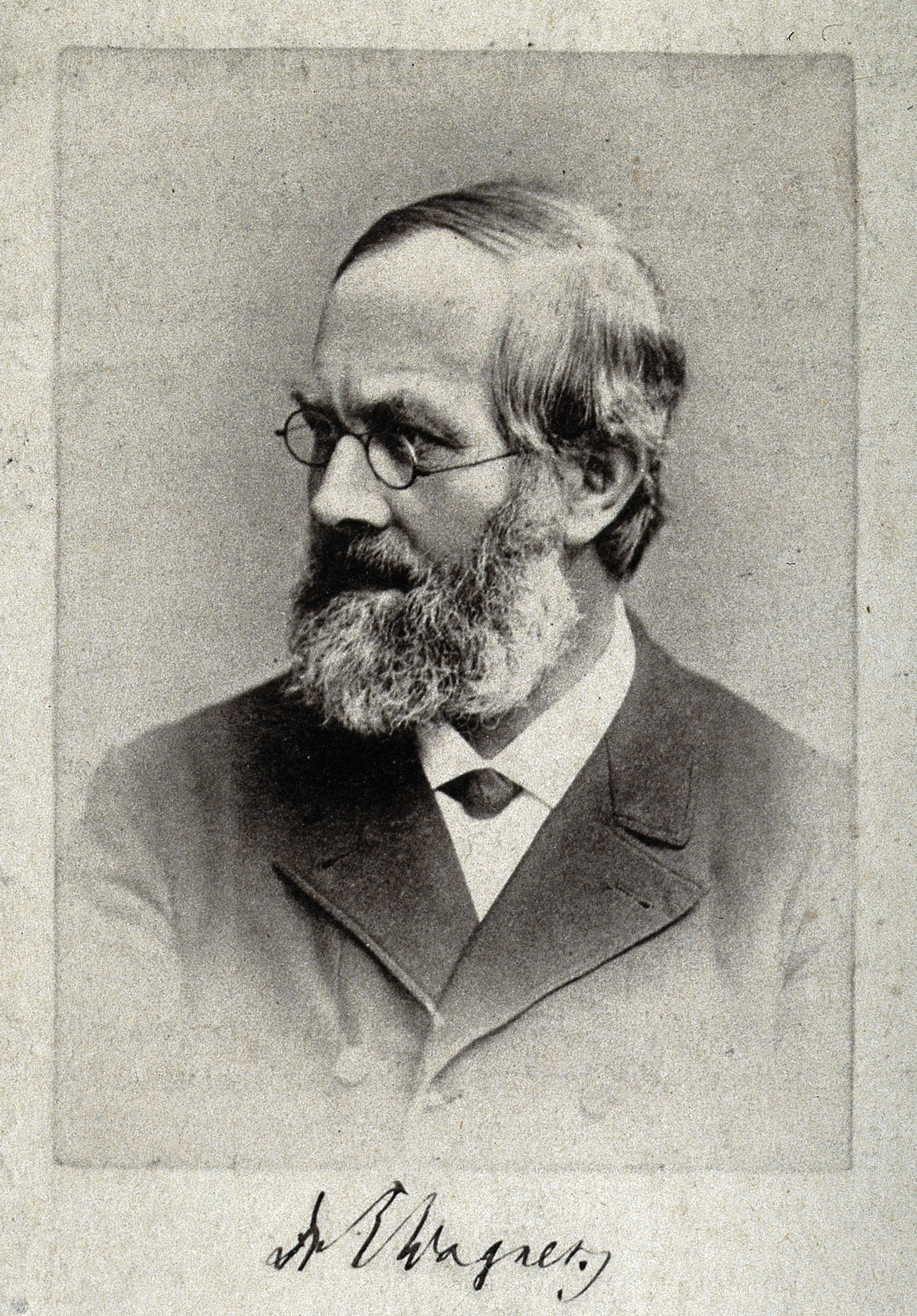
- Born: 12 March 1829
- Died: 10 February 1888 (aged 58)
- Known for: Wagner-Unverricht syndrome
- Scientific career
- Doctoral students: Walter Hesse

Ernst Leberecht Wagner (12 March 1829 – 10 February 1888) was a German pathologist who was a native of Dehlitz, a town in the Burgenlandkreis district of Saxony-Anhalt.

== Education and career ==
He studied medicine in Leipzig under Karl August Wunderlich (1815–1877), in Prague under Josef Skoda (1805–1881) and in Vienna under Karl von Rokitansky (1804–1878). In 1855 he received his habilitation at the University of Leipzig, where in 1862 he became an associate professor.

In 1869 Wagner became a "full professor" of general pathology and pathological anatomy at the University of Leipzig, and in 1871 founded the first institute of pathology at Leipzig. From 1877 until 1888 he was a professor of pathology and "special therapy" (internal medicine) at Leipzig. Wagner was considered an excellent teacher, and two of his better known assistants were Adolf von Strümpell (1853–1925) and Paul Flechsig (1847–1929).

His best written effort was a textbook on pathology called Handbuch der allgemeinen Pathologie, which was co-authored with Johann Paul Uhle (1827–1861), and published in seven editions and translated into several languages. Wagner made contributions in his research of uterine cancer and embolisms associated with blood vessels of the lung. With Heinrich Unverricht (1853–1912), the eponymous "Wagner-Unverricht syndrome" is named, which is a muscle disease related to polymyositis, characterized by chronic muscle inflammation that results in muscle weakness and skin rash.
