= Atrophin 1 =

Protein found in humans

ATN1

Identifiers
- Aliases: ATN1, B37, D12S755E, DRPLA, HRS, NOD, atrophin 1, CHEDDA
- External IDs: OMIM: 607462; MGI: 104725; GeneCards: ATN1

Gene location (Human)
Chr.	Chromosome 12 (human)
Band	12p13.31	Start	6,924,463 bp
Band	12p13.31	End	6,942,321 bp

Gene location (Mouse)
Chr.	Chromosome 6 (mouse)
Band	6 F2|6 59.17 cM	Start	124,719,507 bp
Band	6 F2|6 59.17 cM	End	124,733,487 bp
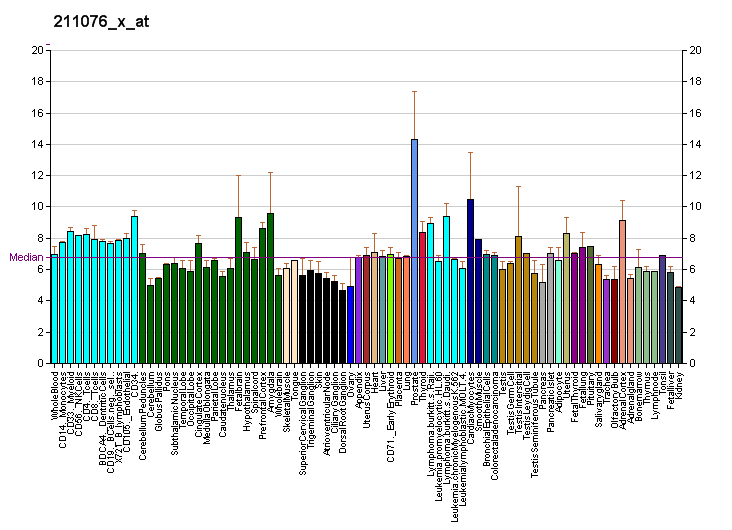

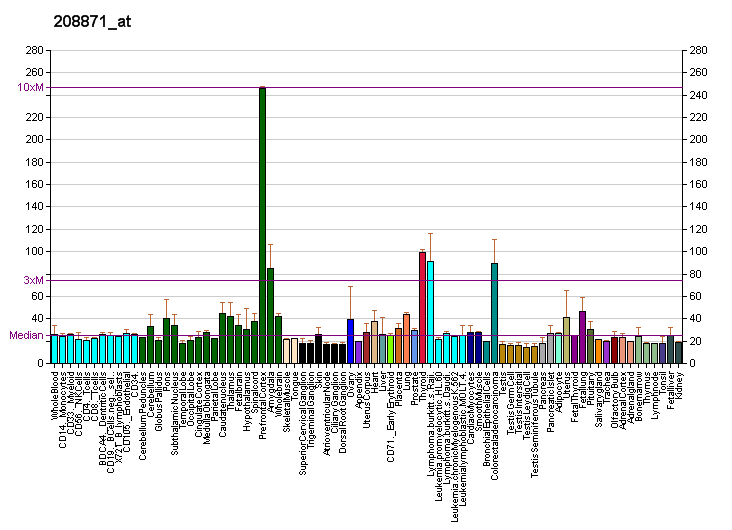

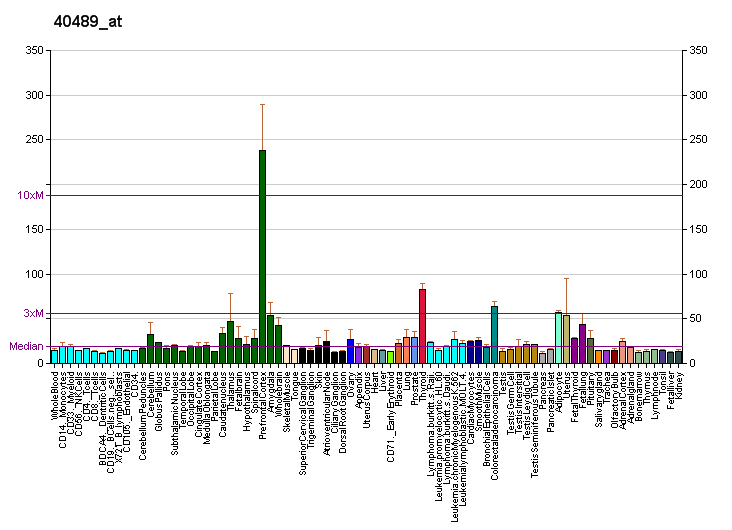
RNA expression pattern
Bgee	Human / Mouse (ortholog); Top expressed in: right hemisphere of cerebellum; anterior pituitary; left ovary; right uterine tube; right ovary; right lobe of thyroid gland; left lobe of thyroid gland; body of uterus; gastric mucosa; canal of the cervix / Top expressed in: neural layer of retina; primary visual cortex; superior frontal gyrus; genital tubercle; dentate gyrus of hippocampal formation granule cell; cerebellar cortex; muscle of thigh; lip; ventricular zone; tail of embryo; More reference expression data
BioGPS	More reference expression data
Gene ontology
Molecular function	protein binding; transcription corepressor activity; protein domain specific binding; DNA binding
Cellular component	nuclear matrix; perinuclear region of cytoplasm; cell junction; nucleoplasm; cytoplasm; nucleus
Biological process	neuron apoptotic process; central nervous system development; regulation of transcription, DNA-templated; negative regulation of transcription by RNA polymerase II; transcription, DNA-templated
Sources:Amigo / QuickGO
Orthologs
Databases	NCBI: entry; OMA: entry
Species	Human	Mouse
Entrez	1822	13498
Ensembl	ENSG00000111676	ENSMUSG00000004263
UniProt	P54259	O35126
RefSeq (mRNA)	NM_001940; NM_001007026	NM_007881
RefSeq (protein)	NP_001007027; NP_001931	NP_031907
Location (UCSC)	Chr 12: 6.92 – 6.94 Mb	Chr 6: 124.72 – 124.73 Mb
PubMed search
- Wikidata
View/Edit Human	View/Edit Mouse

Atrophin-1 is a protein that in humans is encoded by the ATN1 gene. The encoded protein includes a serine repeat and a region of alternating acidic and basic amino acids, as well as the variable glutamine repeat. The function of Atrophin-1 has not yet been determined. There is evidence provided by studies of Atrophin-1 in animals to suggest it acts as a transcriptional co-repressor. Atrophin-1 can be found in the nuclear and cytoplasmic compartments of neurons. It is expressed in nervous tissue.

== Function ==
The function of Atrophin-1 has not been defined yet. It is widely hypothesized that Atrophin-1 functions as a transcriptional co-repressor. A transcriptional co-repressor is a protein that indirectly suppresses the activity of specific genes by interacting with DNA-binding proteins.

== Clinical significance ==
The ATN1 gene has a segment of DNA called the CAG trinucleotide repeat. It is made up of cytosine, adenine, and guanine. The number of CAG repeats in the ATN1 gene in a healthy person will range from six to thirty-five repeats. CAG repeats that exceed thirty-five can cause a gain-of-function mutation in ATN1. Studies have supported the idea that mutated Atrophin-1 gathers in neurons and disrupts cell function. The sequence of the ATN1 gene contains a nuclear localizing signal (NLS) and a nuclear export signal (NES). It has been shown that a mutation of the NES in ATN1 can change where ATN1 localizes, and can cause aggregation to occur in the nucleus. This can lead to an increase in cellular toxicity.

Mutations in ATN1 are associated with a form of trinucleotide repeat disorder known as "dentatorubral-pallidoluysian atrophy" or "dentatorubropallidoluysian atrophy". Dentatorubral-pallidoluysian atrophy (DRPLA) is a rare neurodegenerative disorder characterized by cerebellar ataxia, myoclonic epilepsy, choreoathetosis, and dementia. The disorder is related to the expansion of a trinucleotide repeat within this gene. In patients with DRPLA, truncated ATN1 has been observed forming intranuclear aggregates that cause cell death. The symptoms of this disorder can be credited to the significant reduction of brain and spinal tissue observed in those afflicted with DRPLA. There are both juvenile-onset and late adult-onset variants of DRPLA, which show differing degrees of severity of specific symptoms.

== Interactions ==
ATN1 has been shown to interact with:

- BAIAP2,
- MAGI1,
- MAGI2,
- RERE, and
- WWP2.
