= KCNC1 =

Protein-coding gene in the species Homo sapiens

Identifiers
- Aliases: KCNC1, KV3.1, KV4, NGK2, EPM7, potassium voltage-gated channel subfamily C member 1
- External IDs: OMIM: 176258; MGI: 96667; GeneCards: KCNC1

Gene location (Human)
Chr.	Chromosome 11 (human)
Band	11p15.1	Start	17,734,774 bp
Band	11p15.1	End	17,856,804 bp

Gene location (Mouse)
Chr.	Chromosome 7 (mouse)
Band	7 B3|7 30.1 cM	Start	46,045,921 bp
Band	7 B3|7 30.1 cM	End	46,088,128 bp
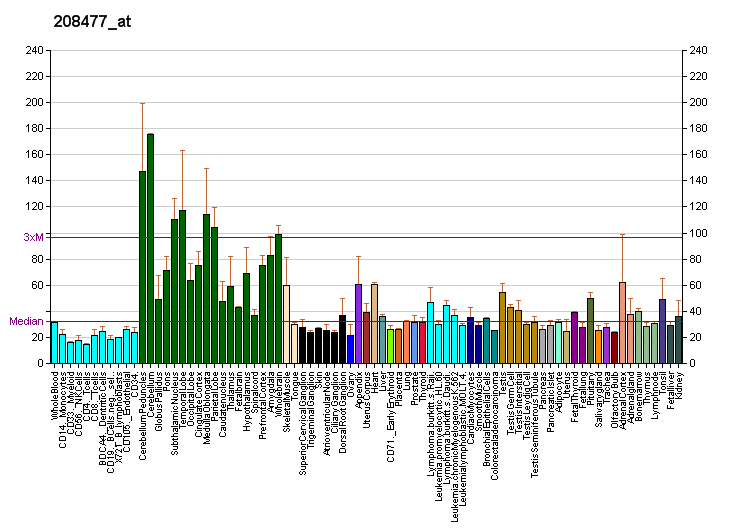
RNA expression pattern
Bgee	Human / Mouse (ortholog); Top expressed in: right hemisphere of cerebellum; primary visual cortex; cerebellar vermis; right frontal lobe; Brodmann area 9; prefrontal cortex; Brodmann area 23; cingulate gyrus; anterior cingulate cortex; postcentral gyrus / Top expressed in: cerebellar cortex; lobe of cerebellum; cerebellar vermis; substantia nigra; pontine nuclei; lateral geniculate nucleus; deep cerebellar nuclei; medial geniculate nucleus; medial vestibular nucleus; dorsal tegmental nucleus; More reference expression data
BioGPS	More reference expression data
Gene ontology
Molecular function	potassium channel activity; transmembrane transporter binding; voltage-gated ion channel activity; ion channel activity; voltage-gated potassium channel activity; delayed rectifier potassium channel activity; kinesin binding; voltage-gated ion channel activity involved in regulation of presynaptic membrane potential
Cellular component	integral component of membrane; membrane; voltage-gated potassium channel complex; plasma membrane; neuronal cell body membrane; cell surface; soma; dendrite; neuron projection membrane; axolemma; dendrite membrane; calyx of Held; integral component of postsynaptic membrane; integral component of presynaptic membrane; axon
Biological process	response to potassium ion; response to nerve growth factor; response to fibroblast growth factor; regulation of ion transmembrane transport; ion transport; protein tetramerization; globus pallidus development; cerebellum development; potassium ion transport; brain development; transmembrane transport; potassium ion transmembrane transport; response to amine; positive regulation of potassium ion transmembrane transport; response to auditory stimulus; response to light intensity; protein homooligomerization; positive regulation of ion transmembrane transport; response to toxic substance; regulation of potassium ion transmembrane transport; positive regulation of voltage-gated potassium channel activity; regulation of presynaptic membrane potential
Sources:Amigo / QuickGO
Orthologs
Databases	NCBI: entry; OMA: entry
Species	Human	Mouse
Entrez	3746	16502
Ensembl	ENSG00000129159	ENSMUSG00000058975
UniProt	P48547	P15388
RefSeq (mRNA)	NM_001112741; NM_004976	NM_001112739; NM_008421
RefSeq (protein)	NP_001106212; NP_004967	NP_001106210; NP_032447
Location (UCSC)	Chr 11: 17.73 – 17.86 Mb	Chr 7: 46.05 – 46.09 Mb
PubMed search
- Wikidata
View/Edit Human	View/Edit Mouse

Potassium voltage-gated channel subfamily C member 1 is a protein that in humans is encoded by the KCNC1 gene.

The Shaker gene family of Drosophila encodes components of voltage-gated potassium channels and comprises four subfamilies. Based on sequence similarity, this gene is similar to one of these subfamilies, namely the Shaw subfamily. The protein encoded by this gene belongs to the delayed rectifier class of channel proteins and is an integral membrane protein that mediates the voltage-dependent potassium ion permeability of excitable membranes.

== Expression pattern ==
K_{v}3.1 and K_{v}3.2 channels are prominently expressed in neurons that fire at high frequency. K_{v}3.1 channels are prominently expressed in brain (cerebellum > globus pallidus, subthalamic nucleus, substantia nigra > reticular thalamic nuclei, cortical and hippocampal interneurons > inferior colliculi, cochlear and vestibular nuclei), and in retinal ganglion cells.

== Physiological role ==
K_{v}3.1/K_{v}3.2 conductance is necessary and kinetically optimized for high-frequency action potential generation. K_{v}3.1 channels are important for the high-firing frequency of auditory and fast-spiking GABAergic interneurons, retinal ganglion cells; regulation of action potential duration in presynaptic terminals.

== Pharmacological properties ==
K_{v}3.1 currents in heterologous systems are highly sensitive to external tetraethylammonium (TEA) or 4-aminopyridine (4-AP) (IC_{50} values are 0.2 mM and 29 μM respectively). This can be useful in identifying native channels. The overlapping sensitivity of potassium current to both 0.5 mM TEA and 30 μM 4-AP strongly suggest an action on K_{v}3.1 subunits.

== Transcript variants ==
There are two transcript variants of K_{v}3.1 gene: K_{v}3.1a and K_{v}3.1b. K_{v}3.1 isoforms differ only in their C-terminal sequence.

== Clinical significance ==
A missense mutation c.959G>A (p.Arg320His) in KCNC1 causes progressive myoclonus epilepsy.

== See also ==
- Voltage-gated potassium channel
