= Cystatin-B =

Protein-coding gene in the species Homo sapiens

An Error has occurred retrieving Wikidata item for infobox Cystatin-B is a protein that in humans is encoded by the CSTB gene.

The cystatin superfamily encompasses proteins that contain multiple cystatin-like sequences. Some of the members are active cysteine protease inhibitors, while others have lost or perhaps never acquired this inhibitory activity. There are three inhibitory families in the superfamily, including the type 1 cystatins (stefins), type 2 cystatins and kininogens. This gene encodes a stefin that functions as an intracellular cysteine protease inhibitor. The protein is able to form a dimer stabilized by noncovalent forces, inhibiting papain and cathepsins L, H and B. The protein is thought to play a role in protecting against the proteases leaking from lysosomes. Evidence indicates that mutations in this gene are responsible for the primary defects in patients with Unverricht–Lundborg disease, a form of progressive myoclonic epilepsy (EPM1).

== Interactions ==
Cystatin B has been shown to interact with Cathepsin B.
