= Lafora disease =

Terminal recessive genetic condition

- Other names: Lafora progressive myoclonic epilepsy, or MELF
- Specialty: Neurology
- Usual onset: Late childhood and adolescence, usually ages 8–19 years
- Causes: Mutation in either the EPM2A or EPM2B [NHLRC1] genes
- Differential diagnosis: Other progressive myoclonic epilepsies (sialidosis, myoclonic epilepsy with ragged red fibers, Unverricht-Lundborg disease), Juvenile Myoclonic Epilepsy, Subacute sclerosing panencephalitis, schizophrenia
- Prognosis: Universally fatal; most of the time, death occurs within 10 years after onset of initial symptoms.
- Frequency: 0.0005%

Lafora disease is a rare, autosomal recessive genetic disorder which results in myoclonic epilepsy and usually results in death several years after the onset of symptoms. The disease is characterized by the accumulation of inclusion bodies, known as Lafora bodies, within the cytoplasm of the cells. The Lafora bodies are in the heart, liver, muscle, and skin. Lafora disease is also a neurodegenerative disease that causes impairment in the development of brain (cerebral) cortical neurons and is a glycogen metabolism disorder.

Lafora disease (LD) was described by the Spanish neuropathologist Gonzalo Rodríguez Lafora (1886–1971) in 1911, while directing the Neuropathology Section at the Government Hospital for Mental Insane (current NIH, US).

Lafora disease is very rare in children, adolescents and adults worldwide. However, it has a higher incidence among children and adolescents with ancestry from regions where consanguineous relationships are common, namely the Mediterranean (North Africa, Southern Europe), the Middle East, India, and Pakistan. Dogs can also have the condition. In dogs, Lafora disease can spontaneously occur in any breed, but the miniature wire-haired dachshund, bassett hound, and beagle are predisposed.

Most patients with this disease do not live past the age of twenty-five, and it often leads to death within ten years of symptoms appearing. Late onset symptoms of this disease can begin at any age depending on the genes affected. At present, there is no cure for this disease, but there are ways to deal with symptoms through treatments and medications. There are five patient organizations worldwide that share resources and support the Lafora patient community.

== Signs and symptoms ==
Symptoms of Lafora disease begin to develop during the early adolescent years, and symptoms progress as time passes. Prior to this, there is generally no indication of the presence of the disease, though in a few cases, the disease presents as a learning disorder around five years of age. In extremely rare cases, symptoms may not show at all until as late as the third decade of life, though these cases have slower progression than typical LD. The most common feature of Lafora disease is seizures that have been reported mainly as occipital seizures and myoclonic seizures with some cases of generalized tonic-clonic seizures, atypical absence seizures, and atonic and complex partial seizures. Other symptoms common with the seizures are drop attacks, ataxia, temporary blindness, visual hallucinations, and a quickly-developing and dramatic dementia.

Other common signs and symptoms associated with Lafora disease are behavioral changes due to the frequency of seizures. Over time those affected with Lafora disease have brain changes that cause confusion, speech difficulties, depression, decline in intellectual function, impaired judgement and impaired memory. If areas of the cerebellum are affected by seizures, it is common to see problems with speech, coordination, and balance in Lafora patients.

For dogs that are affected with Lafora disease, common symptoms are rapid shuddering, shaking, or jerking of the canine's head backwards, high pitched vocalizations that could indicate the dog is panicking, seizures, and – as the disease progresses – dementia, blindness, and loss of balance.

Within ten years of developing symptoms, life expectancy declines. People who advance to adulthood tend to lose their ability to do daily tasks by themselves, which can require comprehensive care. If their symptoms progress extremely quickly or at an early age, patients receive comprehensive care, which – besides medication – means support during daily activities both physically and mentally.

== Genetics ==
Lafora disease is an autosomal recessive disorder, caused by loss of function mutations in either the laforin glycogen phosphatase gene (EPM2A) or malin E3 ubiquitin ligase gene (NHLRC1). These mutations in either of these two genes lead to polyglucosan formation or lafora body formation in the cytoplasm of heart, liver, muscle, and skin.

'Graph 1' shows the data for 250 families that have been affected by Lafora disease and the distribution of cases around the world. The graph shows that there is a very large number of cases in Italy because of a higher occurrence of EPM2A gene mutation compared to any other country in the world.

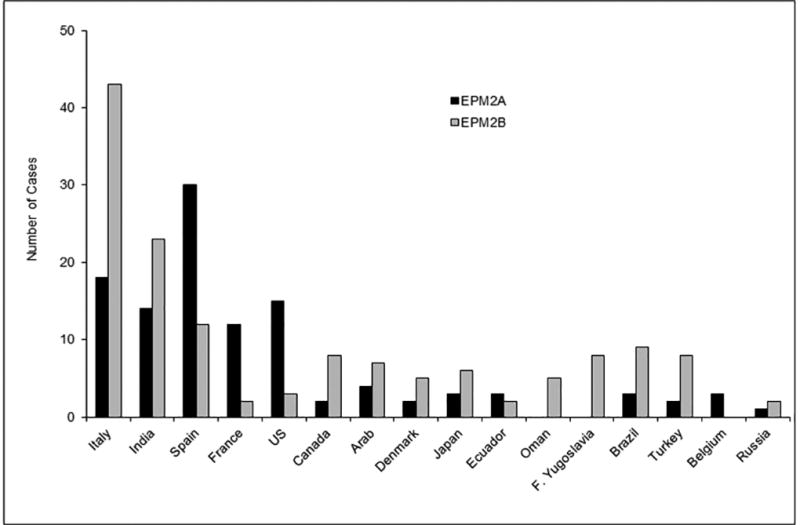
'Graph 1' Represents data that shows how Lafora disease has been distributed throughout not just the United States but the world as a whole. This particular graph shows 250 families that have been affected by Lafora Disease.

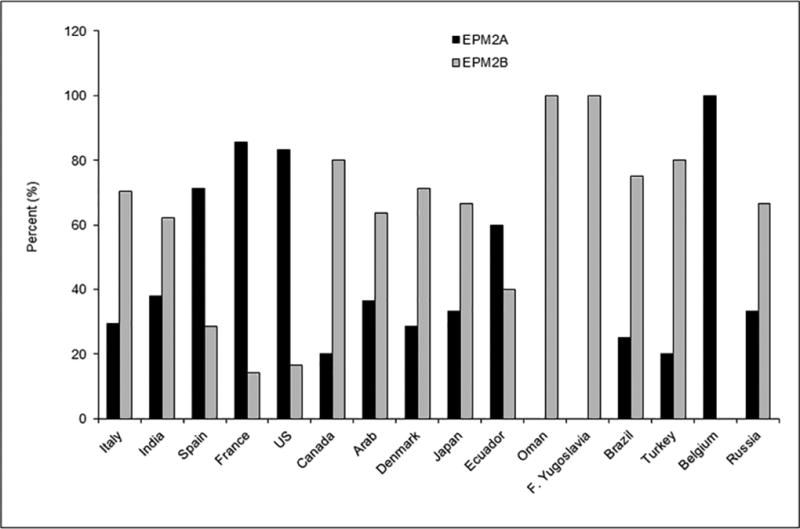
'Graph 2' Represents data that shows how the gene mutation for both EPM2A and EPM2B has been distributed around the world. The data goes to show that there are more cases caused by EPM2B than there are for EPM2B (NHLRC1).

'Graph 2' shows the percentage distribution of the cases from either an EPM2A gene mutation or an EPM2B (NHLRC1) gene mutation. 42% of the cases are caused by EPM2A and 58% are caused by EPM2B (NHLRC1). The most common mutation on the EPM2A gene is the R241X mutation. This genetic mutation is the cause for 17% of the EPM2A-caused Lafora disease cases.

EPM2A codes for the protein laforin, a dual-specificity phosphatase that acts on carbohydrates by taking phosphates off.

NHLRC1 encodes the protein malin, an E3 ubiquitin ligase, that regulates the amount of laforin.

Laforin is essential for making the normal structure of a glycogen molecule. When the mutation occurs on the EPM2A gene, laforin protein is down-regulated and less of this protein is present or none is made at all. If there is also a mutation in the NHLRC1 gene that makes the protein malin, then laforin cannot be regulated and thus less of it is made.

Less laforin means more phosphorylation of glycogen, causing conformational changes, rendering it insoluble, leading to an accumulation of misformed glycogen, which has neurotoxic effects.

Lafora disease has an autosomal recessive pattern of inheritance. EPM2A gene found on chromosome 6q24 and NHLRC1 gene found on chromosome 6p22.3.

In a laforin mutation, glycogen would be hyperphosphorylated; this has been confirmed in laforin knock-out mice.

Research literature also suggests that over-activity of glycogen synthase, the key enzyme in synthesizing glycogen, can lead to the formation of polyglucosans and it can be inactivated by phosphorylation at various amino acid residues by many molecules, including GSK-3beta, Protein phosphatase 1, and malin.

As defective enzyme molecules participate in the production of these molecules (GSK-3beta, PP1, and malin), excessive glycogen synthase activity occurs in combination with mutations in laforin that phosphorylates the excess glycogen being made, rendering it insoluble. The key player missing is ubiquitin. It is not able to degrade the excess amount of the insoluble lafora bodies. Since mutations arise in malin, an e3 ubiquitin ligase, this directly interferes with the degradation of laforin, causing the laforin not to be degraded. In this case laforin is then hyperphosphorylated.

== Lafora bodies ==
Lafora disease is distinguished by the presence of inclusions called Lafora bodies within the cytoplasm of cells. Lafora bodies are aggregates of polyglucosans or abnormally shaped glycogen molecules. Glycogen in Lafora disease patients has abnormal chain lengths, which causes them to be insoluble, accumulate, and have a neurotoxic effect.

For glycogen to be soluble, there must be short chains and a high frequency of branching points, but this is not found in the glycogen in Lafora patients. LD patients have longer chains that have clustered arrangement of branch points that form crystalline areas of double helices making it harder for them to clear the blood-brain barrier. The glycogen in LD patients also has higher phosphate levels and is present in greater quantities.

== Diagnosis ==
Lafora disease is diagnosed by conducting a series of tests by a neurologist, epileptologist (person who specializes in epilepsy), or geneticist. To confirm the diagnosis, an EEG, MRI, and genetic testing are needed. A biopsy may be necessary as well to detect and confirm the presence of Lafora bodies in the skin.

== Treatment ==
There is no cure for Lafora disease with treatment being limited to controlling seizures through anti-epileptic and anti-convulsant medications. The treatment is usually based on the individual's specific symptoms and the severity of those symptoms. Some examples of medications include valproate, levetiracetam, topiramate, benzodiazepines, or perampanel. Although the symptoms and seizures can be controlled for a long period by using anti-epileptic drugs, the symptoms will progress and patients lose their ability to perform daily activities leading to the survival rate of approximately 10 years after symptoms begin. Quality of life worsens as the years go on, with some patients requiring a feeding tube so that they can get the nutrition and medication they need in order to keep living, but not necessarily functioning. Recently Metformin is approved for the treatment.

== Epidemiology ==
All the reports that have been published on Lafora disease have shown that the overall prevalence of the disease is about 4 cases per million individuals around the world. Lafora disease is much more prevalent in countries that have higher cases of inbreeding. Usually, these locations are geographically or culturally more isolated from the world at large.

== Research ==
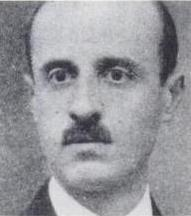
Gonzalo Rodríguez Lafora, discoverer of the disease

The disease is named after Gonzalo Rodríguez Lafora (1886–1971), a Spanish neuropathologist who first recognized small inclusion bodies in Lafora patients in the early to mid 1900s.

Recent research has investigated whether inhibition of glycogen synthesis through restriction of glucose intake could potentially stop the formation of the Lafora Bodies in neurons in laforin-deficient mice models while also reducing the chances of seizures.

Researchers in the U.S., Canada, and Europe formed the Lafora Epilepsy Cure Initiative with funding from the National Institutes of Health. The group aims to interrupt the process of how the mutations in laforin and malin interfere with normal carbohydrate metabolism in mice models.

== Society and culture ==
=== Patient organizations ===
There are patient organizations in the United States (Chelsea's Hope), Italy (Tempo Zero and A.I.L.A.), France (France Lafora), and Spain (AEVEL).

Chelsea's Hope began as a website in the fall of 2007 as a means to share Chelsea Gerber's story with her family and friends. As the Gerber family connected with others affected by Lafora, they formed a patient advocacy organization in September 2009. Chelsea's Hope Lafora Children Research Fund is an IRS 501(c)3 non-profit organization, EIN: 27-1008382. The mission of Chelsea's Hope is to improve the lives of those affected by Lafora Disease and help accelerate the development of treatments.

In 2016, shortly before Chelsea's death, her mother Linda recorded a video sharing a day in their life. From myoclonus to a feeding tube replacement, viewers can learn what it means to live with Lafora Disease.
