= NHLRC1 =

Protein-coding gene in the species Homo sapiens

Identifiers
- Aliases: NHLRC1, EPM2A, EPM2B, MALIN, bA204B7.2, NHL repeat containing E3 ubiquitin protein ligase 1
- External IDs: OMIM: 608072; MGI: 2145264; GeneCards: NHLRC1
Enzyme activity
EC #	BRENDA	ExPASy	KEGG	MetaCyc
2.3.2.27	↗	↗	↗	↗

Gene location (Human)
Chr.	Chromosome 6 (human)
Band	6p22.3	Start	18,120,440 bp
Band	6p22.3	End	18,122,677 bp

Gene location (Mouse)
Chr.	Chromosome 13 (mouse)
Band	13|13 A5	Start	47,166,033 bp
Band	13|13 A5	End	47,168,326 bp
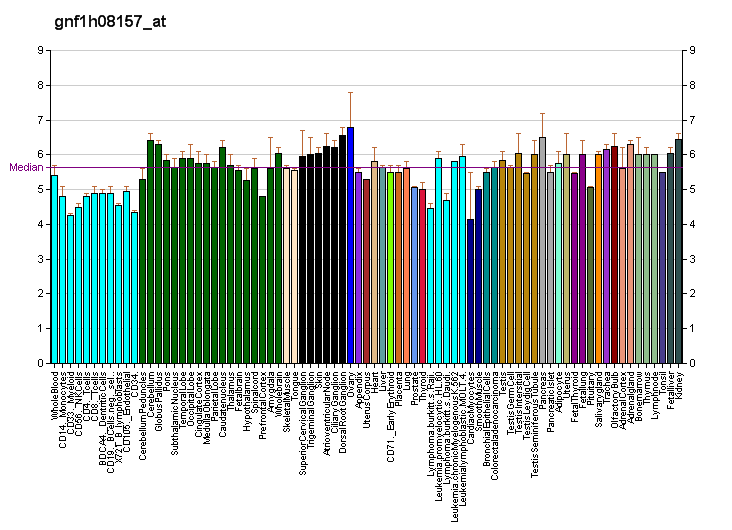
RNA expression pattern
Bgee	Human / Mouse (ortholog); Top expressed in: prefrontal cortex; islet of Langerhans; muscle of thigh; right lobe of liver; superior frontal gyrus; stromal cell of endometrium; gastrocnemius muscle; Brodmann area 9; skin of leg; right adrenal gland / Top expressed in: interventricular septum; dorsomedial hypothalamic nucleus; arcuate nucleus; median eminence; paraventricular nucleus of hypothalamus; ventromedial nucleus; ventral tegmental area; suprachiasmatic nucleus; habenula; subiculum; More reference expression data
BioGPS	More reference expression data
Gene ontology
Molecular function	metal ion binding; protein binding; ubiquitin protein ligase activity; ubiquitin-protein transferase activity; transferase activity
Cellular component	perinuclear region of cytoplasm; cytosol; endoplasmic reticulum; nucleus
Biological process	autophagy; protein polyubiquitination; glycogen biosynthetic process; positive regulation of protein ubiquitination; protein ubiquitination; proteasome-mediated ubiquitin-dependent protein catabolic process; regulation of protein phosphorylation; glycogen metabolic process; regulation of gene expression; regulation of protein ubiquitination; response to endoplasmic reticulum stress; cellular macromolecule metabolic process; regulation of protein kinase activity; regulation of protein localization to plasma membrane
Sources:Amigo / QuickGO
Orthologs
Databases	NCBI: entry; OMA: entry
Species	Human	Mouse
Entrez	378884	105193
Ensembl	ENSG00000187566	ENSMUSG00000044231
UniProt	Q6VVB1	Q8BR37
RefSeq (mRNA)	NM_198586	NM_175340
RefSeq (protein)	NP_940988	NP_780549
Location (UCSC)	Chr 6: 18.12 – 18.12 Mb	Chr 13: 47.17 – 47.17 Mb
PubMed search
- Wikidata
View/Edit Human	View/Edit Mouse

NHL repeat-containing protein 1 is a protein that in humans is encoded by the NHLRC1 gene.

== See also ==
- NHL repeat
