= Laforin =

EPM2A

Identifiers
- Aliases: EPM2A, EPM2, MELF, epilepsy, progressive myoclonus type 2A, Lafora disease (laforin), laforin glucan phosphatase, EPM2A glucan phosphatase, laforin
- External IDs: OMIM: 607566; MGI: 1341085; GeneCards: EPM2A
Available structures
PDB	Ortholog search: PDBe RCSB
PDB	List of PDB id codes 4R30, 4RKK
Enzyme activity
EC #	BRENDA	ExPASy	KEGG	MetaCyc
3.1.3.16	↗	↗	↗	↗
3.1.3.48	↗	↗	↗	↗

Gene location (Human)
Chr.	Chromosome 6 (human)
Band	6q24.3	Start	145,382,535 bp
Band	6q24.3	End	145,736,023 bp

Gene location (Mouse)
Chr.	Chromosome 10 (mouse)
Band	10|10 A1	Start	11,219,148 bp
Band	10|10 A1	End	11,335,388 bp
RNA expression pattern
Bgee	Human / Mouse (ortholog); Top expressed in: Skeletal muscle tissue of rectus abdominis; biceps brachii; muscle of thigh; gastrocnemius muscle; Skeletal muscle tissue of biceps brachii; vastus lateralis muscle; thoracic diaphragm; body of tongue; deltoid muscle; right ventricle / Top expressed in: muscle of thigh; superior frontal gyrus; neural layer of retina; dentate gyrus of hippocampal formation granule cell; primary visual cortex; morula; cerebellar cortex; lip; skeletal muscle tissue; embryo; More reference expression data
BioGPS	n/a
Gene ontology
Molecular function	phosphoprotein phosphatase activity; starch binding; hydrolase activity; protein tyrosine/serine/threonine phosphatase activity; protein binding; protein serine/threonine phosphatase activity; protein tyrosine phosphatase activity; phosphatase activity; carbohydrate phosphatase activity; carbohydrate binding; protein homodimerization activity; protein dimerization activity; glycogen binding; polysaccharide binding
Cellular component	cytoplasm; polysome; membrane; endoplasmic reticulum; plasma membrane; cytosol; nucleoplasm; nucleus; cytoplasmic side of rough endoplasmic reticulum membrane; endoplasmic reticulum membrane; dendrite; perikaryon; cytoplasmic side of endoplasmic reticulum membrane
Biological process	protein dephosphorylation; habituation; glycogen biosynthetic process; positive regulation of macroautophagy; nervous system development; autophagy; negative regulation of phosphatase activity; dephosphorylation; negative regulation of dephosphorylation; peptidyl-tyrosine dephosphorylation; phosphorylated carbohydrate dephosphorylation; glycogen metabolic process; carbohydrate metabolic process; autophagosome assembly; regulation of cell growth; regulation of protein phosphorylation; calcium ion transport; mitochondrion organization; regulation of gene expression; negative regulation of gene expression; glial cell proliferation; L-glutamate transmembrane transport; regulation of protein ubiquitination; negative regulation of peptidyl-serine phosphorylation; regulation of phosphorylation; proteasome-mediated ubiquitin-dependent protein catabolic process; cellular macromolecule metabolic process; negative regulation of cell cycle; regulation of protein kinase activity; regulation of proteasomal protein catabolic process; regulation of protein localization to plasma membrane; regulation of ubiquitin protein ligase activity; regulation of glycogen (starch) synthase activity; Wnt signaling pathway; regulation of protein import into nucleus; protein homooligomerization; negative regulation of TOR signaling
Sources:Amigo / QuickGO
Orthologs
Databases	NCBI: entry; OMA: entry
Species	Human	Mouse
Entrez	7957	13853
Ensembl	ENSG00000112425	ENSMUSG00000055493
UniProt	O95278	Q9WUA5
RefSeq (mRNA)	NM_001018041; NM_005670; NM_001360057; NM_001360064; NM_001360071 NM_001368129; NM_001368130; NM_001368131; NM_001368132	NM_010146
RefSeq (protein)	NP_001018051; NP_005661; NP_001346986; NP_001346993; NP_001347000 NP_001355058; NP_001355059; NP_001355060; NP_001355061	NP_034276
Location (UCSC)	Chr 6: 145.38 – 145.74 Mb	Chr 10: 11.22 – 11.34 Mb
PubMed search
- Wikidata
View/Edit Human	View/Edit Mouse

epilepsy, progressive myoclonus type 2A, Lafora disease (laforin)

Identifiers
- Symbol: EPM2A
- NCBI gene: 7957
- HGNC: 3413
- OMIM: 607566
- PDB: 4RKK
- RefSeq: NM_001018041
- UniProt: O95278

Other data
- Locus: Chr. 6 q24
Search for
- Structures: Swiss-model
- Domains: InterPro

Laforin, encoded by the EPM2A gene, is a phosphatase, with a carbohydrate-binding domain, which is mutated in patients with Lafora disease. It contains a dual specificity phosphatase domain (DSP) and a carbohydrate binding module subtype 20 (CBM20). Its physiological substrate has yet to be identified and the molecular mechanisms in which mutated laforin causes Lafora disease is unknown, though there has been progress made in the study by Ortolano et al. Laforin regulates autophagy via Mammalian target of rapamycin, which is impaired in Lafora disease.
