= Michael Anton Biermer =

German internist (1827–1892)

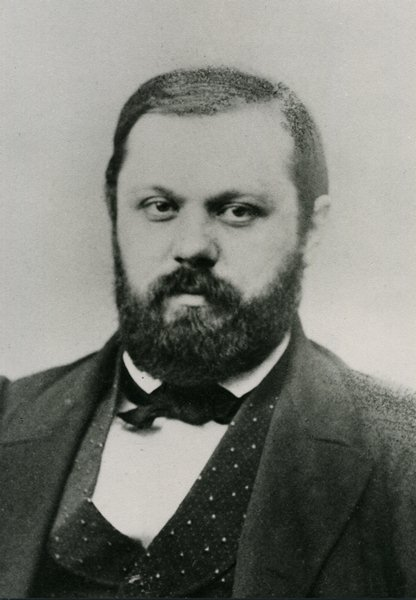
- Born: 18 October 1827; Bamberg
- Died: 15 October 1892 (aged 64); Schöneberg
- Education: University of Würzburg
- Occupation: doctor (internist)
- Known for: pernicious anemia

Michael Anton Biermer (18 October 1827 – 15 October 1892) was a German internist who was a native of Bamberg.

In 1851 he earned his doctorate from the University of Würzburg, where he was a student of Rudolf Virchow. Later he was a professor at Bern (from 1861), Zurich (from 1867) and Breslau (1874–91). Two of his better known students were surgeon Theodor Kocher (1841-1917) in Zurich, and dermatologist Albert Neisser (1855-1916) in Breslau.

In 1860 Biermer was the first to describe a patient with acute lymphoblastic leukemia, 5-year old Maria Speyer. In 1872 he described a disorder he called "progressive pernicious anemia". He wrote about the disease in an article titled Über eine eigentümliche Form von progressiver, perniciöser Anaemie. He called it "pernicious anemia" because of the disease's insidious course, and because it was deemed to be untreatable at the time. In 1849, Thomas Addison described the same disease, however Biermer's description was much more comprehensive. Historically, pernicious anemia has also been called "Addison-Biermer disease".

His name is also associated with a medical percussion phenomenon known as "Biermer's change of note".
